This is a list of foreign players in the Premier League, which commenced play in 1992. The following players must meet both of the following two criteria:
Have played at least one Premier League game. Players who were signed by Premier League clubs, but only played in a lower league, cup, and/or European games, or did not play in any competitive games at all, are not included.
Are considered foreign, i.e., outside the United Kingdom determined by the following:
A player is considered foreign if his allegiance is not to play for the national teams of England, Scotland, Wales or Northern Ireland.
More specifically,
If a player has been capped at an international level, the national team is used; if he has been capped by more than one country, the highest level (or the most recent) team is used. These include British players with dual citizenship.
If a player has not been capped at the international level, his country of birth is used, except for those who were born abroad from British parents or moved to the United Kingdom at a young age, and those who clearly indicated to have switched his nationality to another nation.

Clubs listed are those for which the player has played at least one Premier League game – and seasons are those in which the player has played at least one Premier League game. Note that seasons, not calendar years, are used. For example, "1992–95" indicates that the player has played in every season from 1992–93 to 1994–95, but not necessarily every calendar year from 1992 to 1995. Therefore, a player should always have a listing under at least two years – for instance, a player making his debut in 2011, during the 2011–12 season, will have '2011–12' after his name. This follows the general practice in expressing sporting seasons in the UK.

114 of the 207 foreign FIFA-affiliated nations have been represented in the Premier League.  On 23 December 2022, Indonesia became the most recent country to be represented, when Jordi Amat was called up and played for Indonesia.

In bold: players who have played at least one Premier League game in the current season (2022–23), and are still at a club for which they have played. This does not include current players of a Premier League club who have not played a Premier League game in the current season.

Details correct as of 18 March 2023

Africa (CAF)

Algeria 

Mehdi Abeid – Newcastle United – 2014–15
Rayan Aït-Nouri – Wolverhampton Wanderers – 2020–
Nadir Belhadj – Portsmouth – 2008–10
Djamel Belmadi – Manchester City – 2002–03
Ali Benarbia – Manchester City – 2002–03
Saïd Benrahma – West Ham United – 2020–
Nabil Bentaleb – Tottenham Hotspur, Newcastle United – 2013–16, 2019–20
Hameur Bouazza – Watford, Fulham – 2006–08
Madjid Bougherra – Charlton Athletic – 2006–07
Sofiane Feghouli – West Ham United – 2016–17
Rachid Ghezzal – Leicester City – 2018–19
Kamel Ghilas – Hull City – 2009–10
Adlène Guedioura – Wolverhampton Wanderers, Crystal Palace, Watford, Middlesbrough – 2009–12, 2013–17
Rafik Halliche – Fulham – 2010–11
Riyad Mahrez – Leicester City, Manchester City – 2014–
Moussa Saïb – Tottenham Hotspur – 1997–99
Islam Slimani – Leicester City, Newcastle United – 2016–18, 2020–21
Hassan Yebda – Portsmouth – 2009–10

Angola 

Hélder Costa – Wolverhampton Wanderers, Leeds United – 2018–19, 2020–22
Manucho – Manchester United, Hull City – 2008–09

Benin 
Rudy Gestede – Cardiff City, Aston Villa, Middlesbrough – 2013–14, 2015–17
Steve Mounié – Huddersfield Town – 2017–19
Stéphane Sessègnon – Sunderland, West Bromwich Albion – 2010–16

Burkina Faso 
Dango Ouattara – Bournemouth – 2022–
Bertrand Traoré – Chelsea, Aston Villa – 2015–16, 2020–

Burundi 
Saido Berahino – West Bromwich Albion, Stoke City – 2013–18
Gaël Bigirimana – Newcastle United – 2012–13

Cameroon 

Benoît Assou-Ekotto – Tottenham Hotspur – 2006–13
Timothée Atouba – Tottenham Hotspur – 2004–05
Sébastien Bassong – Newcastle United, Tottenham Hotspur, Wolverhampton Wanderers, Norwich City – 2008–14, 2015–16
André Bikey – Reading, Burnley – 2006–08, 2009–10
Gaëtan Bong – Brighton & Hove Albion – 2017–20
Eric Maxim Choupo-Moting – Stoke City – 2017–18
Eric Djemba-Djemba – Manchester United, Aston Villa – 2003–07
Roudolphe Douala – Portsmouth – 2006–07
George Elokobi – Wolverhampton Wanderers – 2009–12
Eyong Enoh – Fulham – 2012–13
Samuel Eto'o – Chelsea, Everton – 2013–15
Marc-Vivien Foé – West Ham United, Manchester City – 1998–2000, 2002–03
Geremi – Middlesbrough, Chelsea, Newcastle United – 2002–09
Joseph-Désiré Job – Middlesbrough – 2000–06
Lauren – Arsenal, Portsmouth – 2000–08
Jean Makoun – Aston Villa – 2010–11
Joël Matip – Liverpool – 2016–
Bryan Mbeumo – Brentford – 2021–
Stéphane Mbia – Queens Park Rangers – 2012–13
Patrick M'Boma – Sunderland – 2001–02
Lucien Mettomo – Manchester City – 2002–03
Valéry Mézague – Portsmouth – 2004–05
Clinton N'Jie – Tottenham Hotspur – 2015–16
Georges-Kévin Nkoudou – Tottenham Hotspur, Burnley – 2016–20
Nicolas Nkoulou – Watford – 2021–22
Allan Nyom – Watford, West Bromwich Albion – 2015–18
Salomon Olembé – Leeds United, Wigan Athletic – 2003–04, 2007–08
Alex Song – Charlton Athletic, Arsenal, West Ham United – 2005–12, 2014–16
Rigobert Song – Liverpool, West Ham United – 1998–2002
Franck Songo'o – Portsmouth – 2005–06, 2007–08
Somen Tchoyi – West Bromwich Albion – 2010–12
Pierre Womé – Fulham – 2002–03
André-Frank Zambo Anguissa – Fulham – 2018–19, 2020–21

Cape Verde 
Bebé – Manchester United – 2010–11
Cabral – Sunderland – 2013–14
Pelé – West Bromwich Albion – 2008–09

Central African Republic 
Frédéric Nimani – Burnley – 2009–10

Congo 
Lucien Aubey – Portsmouth – 2007–08
Christian Bassila – West Ham United, Sunderland – 2000–01, 2005–06
Thievy Bifouma – West Bromwich Albion – 2013–14
Amine Linganzi – Blackburn Rovers – 2009–11
Christopher Samba – Blackburn Rovers, Queens Park Rangers – 2006–13

DR Congo 
Benik Afobe – Bournemouth – 2015–18
Beni Baningime – Everton – 2017–18
Yannick Bolasie – Crystal Palace, Everton – 2013–18
Hérita Ilunga – West Ham United – 2008–11
Giannelli Imbula – Stoke City – 2015–17
Elias Kachunga – Huddersfield Town – 2017–19
Gaël Kakuta – Chelsea, Fulham, Bolton Wanderers – 2009–12
Edo Kayembe – Watford – 2021–22
Neeskens Kebano – Fulham – 2018–19, 2020–21, 2022–
Kazenga LuaLua – Newcastle United – 2007–09, 2010–11
Lomana LuaLua – Newcastle United, Portsmouth – 2000–07
Arthur Masuaku – West Ham United – 2016–22
Chancel Mbemba – Newcastle United – 2015–16, 2017–18
Dieumerci Mbokani – Norwich City, Hull City – 2015–17
Youssouf Mulumbu – West Bromwich Albion, Norwich City – 2008–09, 2010–16
Arnold Mvuemba – Portsmouth – 2006–09
Michel Ngonge – Watford – 1999–2000
Shabani Nonda – Blackburn Rovers – 2006–07
Yoane Wissa – Brentford – 2021–

Egypt 

Ahmed Elmohamady – Sunderland, Hull City, Aston Villa – 2010–15, 2016–17, 2019–21
Mohamed Elneny – Arsenal – 2015–19, 2020–
Ahmed Fathy – Sheffield United – 2006–07
Gedo – Hull City – 2013–14
Hossam Ghaly – Tottenham Hotspur, Derby County – 2006–08
Ahmed Hegazi – West Bromwich Albion – 2017–18, 2020–21
Mido – Tottenham Hotspur, Middlesbrough, Wigan Athletic, West Ham United – 2004–10
Mohamed Salah – Chelsea, Liverpool – 2013–15, 2017–
Mohamed Shawky – Middlesbrough – 2007–09
Ramadan Sobhi – Stoke City, Huddersfield Town – 2016–19
Trézéguet – Aston Villa – 2019–22
Amr Zaki – Wigan Athletic, Hull City – 2008–10

Equatorial Guinea 
Emilio Nsue – Middlesbrough – 2016–17
Pedro Obiang – West Ham United – 2015–19

Gabon 

Pierre-Emerick Aubameyang – Arsenal, Chelsea – 2017–
Daniel Cousin – Hull City – 2008–10
Bruno Ecuele Manga – Cardiff City – 2018–19
Mario Lemina – Southampton, Fulham, Wolverhampton Wanderers – 2017–19, 2020–21, 2022–
Didier Ndong – Sunderland – 2016–17

Gambia 
Modou Barrow – Swansea City – 2014–17

Ghana 

Albert Adomah – Middlesbrough – 2016–17
Junior Agogo – Sheffield Wednesday – 1997–99
Patrick Agyemang – Queens Park Rangers – 2011–12
Daniel Amartey – Leicester City – 2015–19, 2020–
Christian Atsu – Everton, Newcastle United – 2014–15, 2017–20
André Ayew – Swansea City, West Ham United, Nottingham Forest – 2015–18, 2022–
Jordan Ayew – Aston Villa, Swansea City, Crystal Palace – 2015–
Derek Boateng – Fulham – 2013–14
Kevin-Prince Boateng – Tottenham Hotspur, Portsmouth – 2007–10
Malik Buari – Fulham – 2003–04
Joe Dodoo – Leicester City – 2015–16
Michael Essien – Chelsea – 2005–12, 2013–14
Tariqe Fosu – Brentford – 2021–22
Emmanuel Frimpong – Arsenal, Wolverhampton Wanderers, Fulham – 2011–13
Asamoah Gyan – Sunderland – 2010–12
Elvis Hammond – Fulham – 2002–03, 2004–05
Richard Kingson – Birmingham City, Wigan Athletic, Blackpool – 2007–09, 2010–11
Nii Lamptey – Aston Villa, Coventry City – 1994–96
Tariq Lamptey – Chelsea, Brighton & Hove Albion – 2019–
John Mensah – Sunderland – 2009–11
Sulley Muntari – Portsmouth, Sunderland – 2007–08, 2010–11
Alex Nyarko – Everton – 2000–01, 2003–04
Denis Odoi – Fulham – 2018–19, 2020–21
Quincy Owusu-Abeyie – Arsenal, Portsmouth – 2004–06, 2009–10
John Paintsil – West Ham United, Fulham – 2006–11
Thomas Partey – Arsenal – 2020–
Baba Rahman – Chelsea – 2015–16
Mohammed Salisu – Southampton – 2020–
Lloyd Sam – Charlton Athletic – 2004–07
Jeffrey Schlupp – Leicester City, Crystal Palace – 2014–
Antoine Semenyo – Bournemouth – 2022–
Kamaldeen Sulemana – Southampton – 2022–
Tony Yeboah – Leeds United – 1994–97

Guinea 
Mo Camara – Derby County – 2007–08
Titi Camara – Liverpool, West Ham United – 1999–2003
Ibrahima Cissé – Fulham – 2018–19
Kaba Diawara – Arsenal, West Ham United – 1998–99, 2000–01
Naby Keïta – Liverpool – 2018–
Kamil Zayatte – Hull City – 2008–10

Guinea-Bissau 
Mesca – Fulham – 2013–14

Ivory Coast 

Serge Aurier – Tottenham Hotspur, Nottingham Forest – 2017–21, 2022–
Eric Bailly – Manchester United – 2016–22
Ibrahima Bakayoko – Everton – 1998–99
Sol Bamba – Cardiff City – 2018–19
Jérémie Boga – Chelsea – 2017–18
Willy Boly –Wolverhampton Wanderers, Nottingham Forest – 2018–
Wilfried Bony – Swansea City, Manchester City, Stoke City – 2013–18
Maxwel Cornet – Burnley, West Ham United – 2021–
Siriki Dembélé – Bournemouth – 2022–
Guy Demel – West Ham United – 2011–15
Amad Diallo – Manchester United – 2020–21
Aruna Dindane – Portsmouth – 2009–10
Seydou Doumbia – Newcastle United – 2015–16
Didier Drogba – Chelsea – 2004–12, 2014–15
Emmanuel Eboué – Arsenal – 2004–11
Emerse Faé – Reading – 2007–08
David Datro Fofana – Chelsea – 2022–
Jean-Philippe Gbamin – Everton – 2019–22
Gervinho – Arsenal – 2011–13
Steve Gohouri – Wigan Athletic – 2009–12
Max Gradel – Bournemouth – 2015–17
Sébastien Haller – West Ham United – 2019–21
Salomon Kalou – Chelsea – 2006–12
Hassane Kamara – Watford – 2021–22
Jonathan Kodjia – Aston Villa – 2019–20
Arouna Koné – Wigan Athletic, Everton – 2012–17
Lamine Koné – Sunderland – 2015–17
Abdoulaye Méïté – Bolton Wanderers, West Bromwich Albion – 2006–09, 2010–11
Nicolas Pépé – Arsenal – 2019–22
Abdul Razak – Manchester City – 2010–13
Yannick Sagbo – Hull City – 2013–15
Jean Michaël Seri – Fulham – 2018–19
Olivier Tébily – Birmingham City – 2002–06
Cheick Tioté – Newcastle United – 2010–16
Kolo Touré – Arsenal, Manchester City, Liverpool – 2002–16
Yaya Touré – Manchester City – 2010–18
Hamed Traorè – Bournemouth – 2022–
Lacina Traoré – Everton – 2013–14
Wilfried Zaha – Manchester United, Cardiff City, Crystal Palace – 2013–
Didier Zokora – Tottenham Hotspur – 2006–09

Kenya 
Victor Wanyama – Southampton, Tottenham Hotspur – 2013–20

Liberia 
Alex Nimely – Manchester City – 2009–10
George Weah – Chelsea, Manchester City – 1999–2001
Christopher Wreh – Arsenal – 1997–99

Mali 
Yves Bissouma – Brighton & Hove Albion, Tottenham Hotspur – 2018–
Kalifa Cissé – Reading – 2007–08
Fousseni Diabaté – Leicester City – 2017–19
Samba Diakité – Queens Park Rangers – 2011–13
Mahamadou Diarra – Fulham – 2011–13
Moussa Djenepo – Southampton – 2019–
Abdoulaye Doucouré – Watford, Everton – 2016–
Cheick Doucouré – Crystal Palace – 2022–
Massadio Haïdara – Newcastle United – 2012–16, 2017–18
Frédéric Kanouté – West Ham United, Tottenham Hotspur – 1999–2006
Jimmy Kébé – Reading, Crystal Palace – 2007–08, 2012–14
Modibo Maïga – West Ham United – 2012–15
Bakary Sako – Crystal Palace – 2015–19
Mamady Sidibé – Stoke City – 2008–11
Mohamed Sissoko – Liverpool – 2005–08
Yacouba Sylla – Aston Villa – 2012–14
Boubacar Traoré – Wolverhampton Wanderers – 2022–
Djimi Traoré – Liverpool, Charlton Athletic, Portsmouth – 2000–01, 2002–08
Molla Wagué – Watford – 2017–18

Mauritania 
Aboubakar Kamara – Fulham – 2018–19, 2020–21

Morocco 
Nayef Aguerd – West Ham United – 2022–
Nordin Amrabat – Watford – 2015–18
Oussama Assaidi – Liverpool, Stoke City – 2012–15
Sofiane Boufal – Southampton – 2016–18, 2019–20
Marouane Chamakh – Arsenal, West Ham United, Crystal Palace – 2010–16
Youssef Chippo – Coventry City – 1999–2001
Manuel da Costa – West Ham United – 2009–11
Karim El Ahmadi – Aston Villa – 2012–14
Talal El Karkouri – Sunderland, Charlton Athletic – 2002–03, 2004–07
Tahar El Khalej – Southampton, Charlton Athletic – 1999–2003
Nabil El Zhar – Liverpool – 2006–07, 2008–10
Mustapha Hadji – Coventry City, Aston Villa – 1999–2004
Hassan Kachloul – Southampton, Aston Villa, Wolverhampton Wanderers – 1998–2002, 2003–04
Imran Louza – Watford – 2021–22
Adam Masina – Watford – 2018–20, 2021–22
Noureddine Naybet – Tottenham Hotspur – 2004–06
Abdeslam Ouaddou – Fulham – 2001–03
Abdelhamid Sabiri – Huddersfield Town – 2017–19
Youssef Safri – Norwich City – 2004–05
Romain Saïss – Wolverhampton Wanderers – 2018–22
Adel Taarabt – Tottenham Hotspur, Queens Park Rangers, Fulham – 2006–09, 2011–15
Hakim Ziyech – Chelsea – 2020–

Nigeria 

Julius Aghahowa – Wigan Athletic – 2006–08
Ola Aina – Chelsea, Fulham – 2016–17, 2020–21
Semi Ajayi – West Bromwich Albion – 2020–21
Ade Akinbiyi – Norwich City, Leicester City, Sheffield United – 1993–95, 2000–02, 2006–07
Hope Akpan – Reading – 2012–13
Chuba Akpom – Arsenal – 2013–15
Sammy Ameobi – Newcastle United – 2010–15
Shola Ameobi – Newcastle United, Crystal Palace – 2000–09, 2010–15
Daniel Amokachi – Everton – 1994–96
Victor Anichebe – Everton, West Bromwich Albion, Sunderland – 2005–17
Sone Aluko – Hull City – 2013–15
Joe Aribo – Southampton – 2022–
Taiwo Awoniyi – Nottingham Forest – 2022–
Celestine Babayaro – Chelsea, Newcastle United – 1997–2007
Leon Balogun – Brighton & Hove Albion – 2018–19
Emmanuel Dennis – Watford, Nottingham Forest – 2021–
Efan Ekoku – Norwich City, Wimbledon – 1992–99
Emmanuel Emenike – West Ham United – 2015–16
Peter Etebo – Watford – 2021–22
Dickson Etuhu – Sunderland, Fulham – 2007–12
Kelvin Etuhu – Manchester City – 2007–09
Finidi George – Ipswich Town – 2001–02
Brown Ideye – West Bromwich Albion – 2014–15
Odion Ighalo – Watford, Manchester United – 2015–17, 2019–21
Kelechi Iheanacho – Manchester City, Leicester City – 2015–
Carl Ikeme – Wolverhampton Wanderers – 2011–12
Alex Iwobi – Arsenal, Everton – 2015–
Samuel Kalu – Watford – 2021–22
Blessing Kaku – Bolton Wanderers – 2004–05
Nwankwo Kanu – Arsenal, West Bromwich Albion, Portsmouth – 1998–2010
Freddie Ladapo – Crystal Palace – 2017–18
Ademola Lookman – Everton, Fulham, Leicester City 2016–19, 2020–22
Josh Maja – Fulham – 2020–21
Obafemi Martins – Newcastle United, Birmingham City – 2006–09, 2010–11
Mikel John Obi – Chelsea – 2006–16
Victor Moses – Wigan Athletic, Chelsea, Liverpool, Stoke City, West Ham United – 2009–19
Ahmed Musa – Leicester City – 2016–17
George Ndah – Crystal Palace – 1992–95
Wilfred Ndidi – Leicester City – 2016–
Victor Obinna – West Ham United – 2010–11
Peter Odemwingie – West Bromwich Albion, Cardiff City, Stoke City – 2010–16
Jay-Jay Okocha – Bolton Wanderers – 2002–06
Isaac Okoronkwo – Wolverhampton Wanderers – 2003–04
Seyi Olofinjana – Stoke City, Hull City – 2008–10
Paul Onuachu – Southampton – 2022–
Frank Onyeka – Brentford – 2021–
Danny Shittu – Watford, Bolton Wanderers – 2006–07, 2008–09
Sam Sodje – Reading – 2006–07
Isaac Success – Watford – 2016–17, 2018–20
Taye Taiwo – Queens Park Rangers – 2011–12
William Troost-Ekong – Watford – 2021–22
Ifeanyi Udeze – West Bromwich Albion – 2002–03
John Utaka – Portsmouth – 2007–10
Taribo West – Derby County – 2000–01
Yakubu – Portsmouth, Middlesbrough, Everton, Blackburn Rovers – 2003–12
Joseph Yobo – Everton, Norwich City – 2002–10, 2013–14

Senegal 

Demba Ba – West Ham United, Newcastle United, Chelsea – 2010–14
Habib Beye – Newcastle United, Aston Villa – 2007–11
Henri Camara – Wolverhampton Wanderers, Southampton, Wigan Athletic, West Ham United, Stoke City – 2003–09
Aliou Cissé – Birmingham City, Portsmouth – 2002–06
Papiss Cissé – Newcastle United – 2011–16
Ferdinand Coly – Birmingham City – 2002–03
Ali Dia – Southampton – 1996–97
Mbaye Diagne – West Bromwich Albion – 2020–21
Mohamed Diamé – Wigan Athletic, West Ham United, Hull City, Newcastle United – 2009–15, 2017–19
Salif Diao – Liverpool, Birmingham City, Portsmouth, Stoke City – 2002–06, 2008–12
Lamine Diatta – Newcastle United – 2007–08
Djibril Diawara – Bolton Wanderers – 2001–02
Souleymane Diawara – Charlton Athletic – 2006–07
Papa Bouba Diop – Fulham, Portsmouth – 2004–10
El Hadji Diouf – Liverpool, Bolton Wanderers, Sunderland, Blackburn Rovers – 2002–11
Mame Biram Diouf – Manchester United, Blackburn Rovers, Stoke City – 2009–11, 2014–18
Papy Djilobodji – Sunderland – 2016–17
Khalilou Fadiga – Bolton Wanderers – 2004–06
Abdoulaye Faye – Bolton Wanderers, Newcastle United, Stoke City, Hull City – 2005–11, 2013–14
Amdy Faye – Portsmouth, Newcastle United, Charlton Athletic, Stoke City – 2003–07, 2008–09
Idrissa Gueye – Aston Villa, Everton – 2015–19, 2022–
Magaye Gueye – Everton – 2010–14
Diomansy Kamara – Portsmouth, West Bromwich Albion, Fulham – 2004–06, 2007–11
 Kalidou Koulibaly – Chelsea – 2022–
Cheikhou Kouyaté – West Ham United, Crystal Palace, Nottingham Forest – 2014–
Sadio Mané – Southampton, Liverpool – 2014–22
Kader Mangane – Sunderland – 2012–13
Édouard Mendy – Chelsea – 2020–
Nampalys Mendy – Leicester City – 2016–
Alfred N'Diaye – Sunderland, Hull City – 2012–13, 2016–17
Badou Ndiaye – Stoke City – 2017–18
Iliman Ndiaye – Sheffield United  – 2020–21
Dame N'Doye – Hull City, Sunderland – 2014–16
M'Baye Niang – Watford – 2016–17
Oumar Niasse – Everton, Hull City, Cardiff City – 2015–20
Henri Saivet – Newcastle United – 2015–16, 2017–18
Diafra Sakho – West Ham United – 2014–18
Lamine Sakho – Leeds United – 2003–04
Ismaïla Sarr – Watford – 2019–20, 2021–22
Pape Matar Sarr – Tottenham Hotspur – 2022–
Ibrahima Sonko – Reading, Stoke City, Hull City – 2006–10
Pape Souaré – Crystal Palace – 2014–19
Armand Traoré – Arsenal, Portsmouth, Queens Park Rangers – 2007–10, 2011–13, 2014–15

Seychelles 
Kevin Betsy – Fulham – 2001–02
Michael Mancienne – Chelsea, Wolverhampton Wanderers – 2008–11

Sierra Leone 
Al Bangura – Watford – 2006–07
Steven Caulker – Swansea City, Tottenham Hotspur, Cardiff City, Queens Park Rangers, Southampton, Liverpool 2011–16
Albert Jarrett – Watford – 2006–07
Sullay Kaikai – Crystal Palace – 2015–18
Kei Kamara – Norwich City – 2012–13

South Africa 
Shaun Bartlett – Charlton Athletic – 2000–06
Kagisho Dikgacoi – Fulham, Crystal Palace – 2009–11, 2013–14
Mark Fish – Bolton Wanderers, Charlton Athletic – 1997–98, 2000–05
Quinton Fortune – Manchester United, Bolton Wanderers – 1999–2005, 2006–07
Khanya Leshabela – Leicester City – 2020–21
Mbulelo Mabizela – Tottenham Hotspur – 2003–05
Phil Masinga – Leeds United – 1994–96
Benni McCarthy – Blackburn Rovers, West Ham United – 2006–11
Aaron Mokoena – Blackburn Rovers, Portsmouth – 2004–10
Matty Pattison – Newcastle United – 2005–07
Steven Pienaar – Everton, Tottenham Hotspur, Sunderland – 2007–17
Lucas Radebe – Leeds United – 1994–2001, 2002–04
Tokelo Rantie – Bournemouth – 2015–16
Percy Tau – Brighton & Hove Albion – 2020–21
Eric Tinkler – Barnsley – 1997–98

Tanzania 
Mbwana Samatta – Aston Villa – 2019–20

Togo 
Emmanuel Adebayor – Arsenal, Manchester City, Tottenham Hotspur, Crystal Palace – 2005–16
Floyd Ayité – Fulham – 2018–19
Yoann Folly – Southampton – 2003–05
Moustapha Salifou – Aston Villa – 2007–08

Tunisia 
Yohan Benalouane – Leicester City – 2015–18
Radhi Jaïdi – Bolton Wanderers, Birmingham City – 2004–06, 2007–08
Wahbi Khazri – Sunderland – 2015–17
Hannibal Mejbri – Manchester United – 2020–22
Mehdi Nafti – Birmingham City – 2004–06, 2007–08
Hatem Trabelsi – Manchester City – 2006–07
Yan Valery – Southampton – 2018–23

Zambia 
 Patson Daka – Leicester City – 2021–
Neil Gregory – Ipswich Town – 1994–95
Emmanuel Mayuka – Southampton – 2012–13, 2014–15
Collins Mbesuma – Portsmouth – 2005–06
Enock Mwepu – Brighton & Hove Albion – 2021–23

Zimbabwe 
Benjani – Portsmouth, Manchester City, Sunderland, Blackburn Rovers – 2005–11
Brendan Galloway – Everton, West Bromwich Albion – 2014–17
Bruce Grobbelaar – Liverpool, Southampton – 1992–96
Marvelous Nakamba – Aston Villa – 2019–22
Peter Ndlovu – Coventry City – 1992–97
Jordan Zemura – Bournemouth – 2022–

Asia (AFC)

Australia 

Danny Allsopp – Manchester City – 2000–01
John Aloisi – Coventry City – 1998–2001
Con Blatsis – Derby County – 2000–01
Mark Bosnich – Aston Villa, Manchester United, Chelsea – 1992–2000, 2001–02
Vlado Bozinovski – Ipswich Town – 1992–93
Jacob Burns – Leeds United – 2000–01, 2002–03
Tim Cahill – Everton – 2004–12
David Carney – Blackpool – 2010–11
Chris Coyne – West Ham United – 1998–99
Jason Davidson – West Bromwich Albion – 2014–15
Ahmad Elrich – Fulham – 2005–06
Brett Emerton – Blackburn Rovers – 2003–12
Adam Federici – Reading, Bournemouth – 2006–07, 2012–13, 2015–17
John Filan – Coventry City, Blackburn Rovers, Wigan Athletic – 1994–99, 2005–07
Hayden Foxe – West Ham United, Portsmouth – 2000–02, 2003–04
Tyrese Francois – Fulham – 2020–21, 2022–23
Richard Garcia – West Ham United, Hull City – 2001–02, 2008–10
Vince Grella – Blackburn Rovers – 2008–12
Chris Herd – Aston Villa – 2010–14
Brett Holman – Aston Villa – 2012–13
Mile Jedinak – Crystal Palace – 2013–17
Richard Johnson – Watford – 1999–2000
Brad Jones – Middlesbrough, Liverpool – 2003–09, 2011–13, 2014–15
Jason Kearton – Everton – 1992–93, 1994–95
Harry Kewell – Leeds United, Liverpool – 1995–2008
Neil Kilkenny – Birmingham City – 2005–06
Stan Lazaridis – West Ham United, Birmingham City – 1995–99, 2002–06 
Jordan Lyden – Aston Villa – 2015–16
Steve Mautone – West Ham United – 1996–97
Scott McDonald – Southampton – 2001–02
Jamie McMaster – Leeds United – 2002–03
Craig Moore – Newcastle United – 2005–07
Aaron Mooy – Huddersfield Town, Brighton & Hove Albion – 2017–20
Kevin Muscat – Crystal Palace – 1997–98
Lucas Neill – Blackburn Rovers, West Ham United, Everton – 2001–10
Paul Okon – Middlesbrough, Leeds United – 2000–03
Aiden O'Neill – Burnley – 2016–17
Andy Petterson – Ipswich Town, Charlton Athletic – 1992–93, 1998–99
Tony Popovic – Crystal Palace – 2004–05
Adem Poric – Sheffield Wednesday – 1993–95, 1997–98 
Mathew Ryan – Brighton & Hove Albion, Arsenal – 2017–21
Mark Schwarzer – Middlesbrough, Fulham, Chelsea, Leicester City – 1996–97, 1998–2015
Josip Skoko – Wigan Athletic – 2005–08
Robbie Slater – Blackburn Rovers, West Ham United, Southampton – 1994–98
Brad Smith – Liverpool, Bournemouth – 2013–14, 2015–17
Harry Souttar – Leicester City – 2022–
Mile Sterjovski – Derby County – 2007–08
Danny Tiatto – Manchester City – 2000–01, 2002–04
Carl Veart – Crystal Palace – 1997–98
Tony Vidmar – Middlesbrough – 2002–03
Mark Viduka – Leeds United, Middlesbrough, Newcastle United – 2000–09
Caleb Watts – Southampton – 2020–21
Luke Wilkshire – Middlesbrough – 2001–03
Ned Zelić – Queens Park Rangers – 1995–96

China PR 
Tyias Browning – Everton – 2014–16
Dong Fangzhuo – Manchester United – 2006–07
Li Tie – Everton – 2002–04
Li Weifeng – Everton – 2002–03
Sun Jihai – Manchester City – 2002–08
Nico Yennaris – Arsenal – 2011–12
Zheng Zhi – Charlton Athletic – 2006–07

Indonesia 
Jordi Amat – Swansea City – 2013–17

Iran 
Karim Bagheri – Charlton Athletic – 2000–01
Ashkan Dejagah – Fulham – 2012–14
Saman Ghoddos – Brentford – 2021–
Alireza Jahanbakhsh – Brighton & Hove Albion – 2018–21
Andranik Teymourian – Bolton Wanderers, Fulham – 2006–09

Japan 
Junichi Inamoto – Fulham, West Bromwich Albion – 2002–06
Shinji Kagawa – Manchester United – 2012–14
Takumi Minamino – Liverpool, Southampton – 2019–22
Kaoru Mitoma – Brighton & Hove Albion – 2022–
Ryo Miyaichi – Bolton Wanderers, Wigan Athletic, Arsenal – 2011–14
Yoshinori Muto – Newcastle United – 2018–20
Hidetoshi Nakata – Bolton Wanderers – 2005–06
Shinji Okazaki – Leicester City – 2015–19
Kazuyuki Toda – Tottenham Hotspur – 2002–03
Takehiro Tomiyasu – Arsenal – 2021–
Maya Yoshida – Southampton – 2012–20

Korea Republic 

Cho Won-hee – Wigan Athletic – 2008–10
Hwang Hee-chan – Wolverhampton Wanderers – 2021–
Ji Dong-won – Sunderland – 2011–12, 2013–14
Ki Sung-yueng – Swansea City, Sunderland, Newcastle United – 2012–20
Kim Bo-kyung – Cardiff City – 2013–14
Kim Do-heon – West Bromwich Albion – 2008–09
Lee Chung-yong – Bolton Wanderers, Crystal Palace – 2009–12, 2014–18
Lee Dong-gook – Middlesbrough – 2006–08
Lee Young-pyo – Tottenham Hotspur – 2005–08
Park Chu-young – Arsenal – 2011–12
Park Ji-sung – Manchester United, Queens Park Rangers – 2005–13
Seol Ki-hyeon – Reading, Fulham – 2006–10
Son Heung-min – Tottenham Hotspur – 2015–
Yun Suk-young – Queens Park Rangers – 2014–15

Oman 
Ali Al-Habsi – Bolton Wanderers, Wigan Athletic – 2007–08, 2010–13

Pakistan 
Zesh Rehman – Fulham – 2003–06

Philippines 
Neil Etheridge – Cardiff City – 2018–19

Europe (UEFA)

Albania 
Armando Broja – Chelsea, Southampton – 2019–20, 2021–
Lorik Cana – Sunderland – 2009–10
Thomas Strakosha – Brentford – 2022–

Armenia 
Henrikh Mkhitaryan – Manchester United, Arsenal – 2016–20

Austria 
Marko Arnautović – Stoke City, West Ham United – 2013–19
Daniel Bachmann – Watford – 2021–22
Moritz Bauer – Stoke City – 2017–18
Kevin Danso – Southampton – 2019–20
Aleksandar Dragović – Leicester City – 2017–18
Christian Fuchs – Leicester City – 2015–21
Martin Hiden – Leeds United – 1997–2000
Saša Kalajdžić – Wolverhampton Wanderers – 2022–
Valentino Lazaro – Newcastle United – 2019–20
Jürgen Macho – Sunderland – 2000–03
Stefan Maierhofer – Wolverhampton Wanderers – 2009–10, 2011–12
Alex Manninger – Arsenal – 1997–2001
Christian Mayrleb – Sheffield Wednesday – 1997–98
Emanuel Pogatetz – Middlesbrough, West Ham United – 2005–09, 2012–13
Sebastian Prödl – Watford – 2015–20
Marcel Sabitzer – Manchester United – 2022–
Paul Scharner – Wigan Athletic, West Bromwich Albion – 2005–12
Markus Suttner – Brighton & Hove Albion – 2017–18
Andreas Weimann – Aston Villa – 2010–15
Kevin Wimmer – Tottenham Hotspur, Stoke City – 2015–18
Maximilian Wöber – Leeds United – 2022–

Belarus 
Alexander Hleb – Arsenal, Birmingham City – 2005–08, 2010–11
Sergei Kornilenko – Blackpool – 2010–11

Belgium 

Philippe Albert – Newcastle United – 1994–99
Toby Alderweireld – Southampton, Tottenham Hotspur – 2014–21
Adrian Bakalli – Watford – 1999–2000
Michy Batshuayi – Chelsea, Crystal Palace – 2016–21
Christian Benteke – Aston Villa, Liverpool, Crystal Palace – 2012–22
Jonathan Benteke – Crystal Palace – 2016–17
Jonathan Blondel – Tottenham Hotspur – 2002–04
Ruud Boffin – West Ham United – 2010–11
Dedryck Boyata – Manchester City, Bolton Wanderers – 2009–12, 2013–15
Timothy Castagne – Leicester City – 2020–
Nacer Chadli – Tottenham Hotspur, West Bromwich Albion – 2013–18
Philippe Clement – Coventry City – 1998–99
Thibaut Courtois – Chelsea – 2014–18
Gilles De Bilde – Sheffield Wednesday, Aston Villa – 1999–2001
Kevin De Bruyne – Chelsea, Manchester City – 2013–14, 2015–
Steven Defour – Burnley – 2016–19
Marc Degryse – Sheffield Wednesday – 1995–96
Ritchie De Laet – Manchester United, Norwich City, Leicester City – 2008–10, 2011–12, 2014–16
Mousa Dembélé – Fulham, Tottenham Hotspur – 2010–19
Jason Denayer – Sunderland – 2016–17
Leander Dendoncker – Wolverhampton Wanderers, Aston Villa – 2018–
Laurent Depoitre – Huddersfield Town – 2017–19
Steve De Ridder – Southampton – 2012–13
Björn Engels – Aston Villa – 2019–20
Wout Faes – Leicester City – 2022–
Marouane Fellaini – Everton, Manchester United – 2008–19
Régis Genaux – Coventry City – 1996–97
Eden Hazard – Chelsea – 2012–19
Carl Hoefkens – West Bromwich Albion – 2008–09
Adnan Januzaj – Manchester United, Sunderland – 2013–17
Christian Kabasele – Watford – 2016–20, 2021–22
Vincent Kompany – Manchester City – 2008–19
Roland Lamah – Swansea City – 2012–14
Roméo Lavia – Southampton – 2022–
Romelu Lukaku – Chelsea, West Bromwich Albion, Everton, Manchester United – 2011–19, 2021–22
Dodi Lukebakio – Watford – 2017–18
Orel Mangala – Nottingham Forest – 2022–
Isaac Mbenza – Huddersfield Town – 2018–19
Simon Mignolet – Sunderland, Liverpool – 2010–18
Kevin Mirallas – Everton – 2012–18
Émile Mpenza – Manchester City – 2006–08
Geoffrey Mujangi Bia – Wolverhampton Wanderers – 2009–11
Charly Musonda – Chelsea – 2017–18
Julien Ngoy – Stoke City – 2016–18
Luc Nilis – Aston Villa – 2000–01
Vadis Odjidja-Ofoe – Norwich City – 2015–16
Amadou Onana – Everton – 2022–
Divock Origi – Liverpool – 2015–22
Obbi Oularé – Watford – 2015–16
Sébastien Pocognoli – West Bromwich Albion – 2014–16
Dennis Praet – Leicester City – 2019–21, 2022–
Cédric Roussel – Coventry City – 1999–2001
Albert Sambi Lokonga – Arsenal, Crystal Palace – 2021–
Branko Strupar – Derby County – 1999–2002
Youri Tielemans – Leicester City – 2018–
Leandro Trossard – Brighton & Hove Albion, Arsenal – 2019–
Nico Vaesen – Birmingham City – 2002–03, 2005–06
Daniel Van Buyten – Manchester City – 2003–04
Jelle Van Damme – Southampton, Wolverhampton Wanderers – 2004–05, 2010–11
Anthony Vanden Borre – Portsmouth – 2009–10
Thomas Vermaelen – Arsenal – 2009–14
Jan Vertonghen – Tottenham Hotspur – 2012–20

Bosnia and Herzegovina 
Asmir Begović – Portsmouth, Stoke City, Chelsea, Bournemouth, Everton  – 2008–19, 2021–
Muhamed Bešić – Everton, Sheffield United – 2014–16, 2017–18, 2019–20
Edin Džeko – Manchester City – 2011–15
Sead Kolašinac – Arsenal – 2017–22
Muhamed Konjić – Coventry City – 1998–2001
Mario Vrančić – Norwich City – 2019–20

Bulgaria 
Dimitar Berbatov – Tottenham Hotspur, Manchester United, Fulham – 2006–14
Valeri Bojinov – Manchester City – 2007–09
Boncho Genchev – Ipswich Town – 1992–95
Radostin Kishishev – Charlton Athletic – 2000–07
Stanislav Manolev – Fulham – 2012–13
Martin Petrov – Manchester City, Bolton Wanderers – 2007–12
Stiliyan Petrov – Aston Villa – 2006–12
Svetoslav Todorov – West Ham United, Portsmouth, Wigan Athletic – 2000–02, 2003–04, 2005–07
Aleksandar Tonev – Aston Villa – 2013–14

Croatia 
Aljoša Asanović – Derby County – 1996–98
Boško Balaban – Aston Villa – 2001–02
Slaven Bilić – West Ham United, Everton – 1995–99
Igor Bišćan – Liverpool – 2000–05
Alen Bokšić – Middlesbrough – 2000–03
Duje Ćaleta-Car – Southampton – 2022–
Vedran Ćorluka – Manchester City, Tottenham Hotspur – 2007–12
Eduardo – Arsenal – 2007–08, 2009–10
Nikica Jelavić – Everton, Hull City, West Ham United – 2011–16
Nikola Jerkan – Nottingham Forest – 1996–97
Nikola Kalinić – Blackburn Rovers – 2009–11
Ivan Klasnić – Bolton Wanderers – 2009–12
Mateo Kovačić – Chelsea – 2018–
Andrej Kramarić – Leicester City – 2014–16
Niko Kranjčar – Portsmouth, Tottenham Hotspur, Queens Park Rangers – 2006–12, 2014–15
Filip Krovinović – West Bromwich Albion – 2020–21
Dejan Lovren – Southampton, Liverpool – 2013–20
Silvio Marić – Newcastle United – 1998–2000
Luka Modrić – Tottenham Hotspur – 2008–12
Ivica Mornar – Portsmouth – 2003–04, 2005–06
Mislav Oršić – Southampton – 2022–
Ivan Perišić – Tottenham Hotspur – 2022–
Mladen Petrić – Fulham, West Ham United – 2012–14
Mario Stanić – Chelsea – 2000–04
Igor Štimac – Derby County, West Ham United – 1996–2001
Davor Šuker – Arsenal, West Ham United – 1999–2001
Nikola Vlašić – Everton, West Ham United – 2017–18, 2021–22
Boris Živković – Portsmouth – 2003–04

Cyprus 
Alexis Nicolas – Chelsea – 2003–04
Nikodimos Papavasiliou – Newcastle United – 1993–94
Valentin Roberge – Sunderland – 2013–15

Czech Republic 

Milan Baroš – Liverpool, Aston Villa, Portsmouth – 2002–08
Roman Bednář – West Bromwich Albion – 2008–09, 2010–11
Patrik Berger – Liverpool, Portsmouth, Aston Villa – 1996–2008
Petr Čech – Chelsea, Arsenal – 2004–19
Ondřej Čelůstka – Sunderland – 2013–14
Radek Černý – Tottenham Hotspur, Queens Park Rangers – 2004–05, 2007–08, 2011–12
Vladimír Coufal – West Ham United – 2020–
Marcel Gecov – Fulham – 2011–12
Zdeněk Grygera – Fulham – 2011–12
Jiří Jarošík – Chelsea, Birmingham City – 2004–06
Martin Jiránek – Birmingham City – 2010–11
Tomáš Kalas – Chelsea – 2013–14
Radoslav Kováč – West Ham United – 2008–11
Libor Kozák – Aston Villa – 2013–14, 2015–16
Alex Král – West Ham United – 2021–22
Jan Laštůvka – Fulham – 2006–07
Martin Latka – Birmingham City – 2005–06
Marek Matějovský – Reading – 2007–08
Luděk Mikloško – West Ham United – 1993–98
Karel Poborský – Manchester United – 1996–98
Tomáš Řepka – West Ham United – 2001–03, 2005–06
Tomáš Rosický – Arsenal – 2006–08, 2009–15
David Rozehnal – Newcastle United – 2007–08
Vladimír Šmicer – Liverpool – 1999–2005
Tomáš Souček – West Ham United – 2019–
Pavel Srníček – Newcastle United, Sheffield Wednesday, Portsmouth – 1993–2000, 2003–04, 2006–07
Jan Stejskal – Queens Park Rangers – 1992–94
Matěj Vydra – West Bromwich Albion, Watford, Burnley – 2013–14, 2016–17, 2018–22

Denmark 

Daniel Agger – Liverpool – 2005–14
Martin Albrechtsen – West Bromwich Albion – 2004–06
Joachim Andersen – Fulham, Crystal Palace – 2020–
Stephan Andersen – Charlton Athletic – 2004–06
Leon Andreasen – Fulham – 2007–09
Mikkel Beck – Middlesbrough, Derby County – 1996–97, 1998–2000
Nicklas Bendtner – Arsenal, Sunderland – 2007–14
Mads Bidstrup – Brentford – 2021–22
Philip Billing – Huddersfield Town, Bournemouth – 2017–20, 2022–
Mikkel Bischoff – Manchester City – 2002–03
Oskar Buur – Wolverhampton Wanderers – 2020–21
Andreas Christensen – Chelsea – 2014–15, 2017–22
Andreas Cornelius – Cardiff City – 2013–14
Mikkel Damsgaard – Brentford – 2022–
Peter Degn – Everton – 1998–99
Ronnie Ekelund – Southampton, Manchester City – 1994–96
Christian Eriksen – Tottenham Hotspur, Brentford, Manchester United – 2013–20, 2021–
Viktor Fischer – Middlesbrough – 2016–17
Per Frandsen – Bolton Wanderers – 1997–98, 2001–04
Carsten Fredgaard – Sunderland – 1999–2000
Thomas Gaardsøe – Ipswich Town, West Bromwich Albion – 2001–02, 2004–06
Bjarne Goldbæk – Chelsea, Fulham – 1998–2000, 2001–03
Thomas Gravesen – Everton – 2000–05, 2007–08
Jesper Grønkjær – Chelsea, Birmingham City – 2000–05
Bo Hansen – Bolton Wanderers – 2001–02
Jakob Haugaard – Stoke City – 2015–17
Nicklas Helenius – Aston Villa – 2013–14
Thomas Helveg – Norwich City – 2004–05
Jes Høgh – Chelsea – 1999–2000
Pierre-Emile Højbjerg – Southampton, Tottenham Hotspur – 2016–
Daniel Iversen – Leicester City – 2022–
Lars Jacobsen – Everton, Blackburn Rovers, West Ham United – 2008–11
Brian Jensen – Burnley – 2009–10
Claus Jensen – Charlton Athletic, Fulham – 2000–07
John Jensen – Arsenal – 1992–96
Mathias Jensen – Brentford – 2021–
Niclas Jensen – Manchester City, Fulham – 2002–03, 2005–06
Martin Johansen – Coventry City – 1997–98
Michael Johansen – Bolton Wanderers – 1997–98
Mathias Jørgensen – Huddersfield Town, Brentford – 2017–19, 2021–
Jakob Kjeldbjerg – Chelsea – 1993–95
Rasmus Kristensen – Leeds United – 2022–
Victor Kristiansen – Leicester City – 2022–
Per Krøldrup – Everton – 2005–06
William Kvist – Fulham – 2013–14
Brian Laudrup – Chelsea – 1998–99
Jacob Laursen – Derby County, Leicester City – 1996–2000, 2001–02
Martin Laursen – Aston Villa – 2004–09
Anders Lindegaard – Manchester United – 2011–14
Jonas Lössl – Huddersfield Town, Brentford – 2017–19, 2021–22
Peter Løvenkrands – Newcastle United – 2008–09, 2010–12
Emiliano Marcondes – Bournemouth – 2022–
Jan Mølby – Liverpool – 1992–95
Allan Nielsen – Tottenham Hotspur – 1996–2000
Christian Nørgaard – Brentford – 2021–
Jores Okore – Aston Villa – 2013–16
Henrik Pedersen – Bolton Wanderers – 2001–07
Per Pedersen – Blackburn Rovers – 1996–97
Torben Piechnik – Liverpool – 1992–94
Christian Poulsen – Liverpool – 2010–11
Brian Priske – Portsmouth – 2005–06
Marc Rieper – West Ham United – 1994–98
Mads Roerslev – Brentford – 2021–
Dennis Rommedahl – Charlton Athletic – 2004–07
Kasper Schmeichel – Manchester City, Leicester City – 2007–09, 2014–22
Peter Schmeichel – Manchester United, Aston Villa, Manchester City – 1992–99, 2001–03
Jacob Sørensen – Norwich City – 2021–22
Lasse Sørensen – Stoke City – 2017–18
Mads Bech Sørensen – Brentford – 2021–
Thomas Sørensen – Sunderland, Aston Villa, Stoke City – 1999–2007, 2008–12, 2013–14
Kevin Stuhr Ellegaard – Manchester City – 2003–04
Claus Thomsen – Ipswich Town, Everton – 1994–95, 1996–98
Stig Tøfting – Bolton Wanderers – 2001–03
Jon Dahl Tomasson – Newcastle United – 1997–98
Jannik Vestergaard – Southampton, Leicester City – 2018–
Kenneth Zohore – Cardiff City – 2018–19

Estonia 
Ragnar Klavan – Liverpool – 2016–18
Mart Poom – Derby County, Sunderland, Arsenal – 1997–2003, 2006–07

Faroe Islands 
Gunnar Nielsen – Manchester City – 2009–10

Finland 
Peter Enckelman – Aston Villa, Blackburn Rovers – 1999–2000, 2001–04
Marcus Forss – Brentford – 2021–22
Mikael Forssell – Chelsea, Birmingham City – 1998–99, 2001–02, 2003–06, 2007–08
Sami Hyypiä – Liverpool – 1999–2009
Jussi Jääskeläinen – Bolton Wanderers, West Ham United – 2001–15
Jonatan Johansson – Charlton Athletic – 2000–06
Toni Kallio – Fulham – 2008–10
Joonas Kolkka – Crystal Palace – 2004–05
Shefki Kuqi – Blackburn Rovers, Fulham, Newcastle United – 2005–08, 2010–11
Jari Litmanen – Liverpool – 2000–02
Antti Niemi – Southampton, Fulham – 2002–08
Mixu Paatelainen – Bolton Wanderers – 1995–96
Petri Pasanen – Portsmouth – 2003–04
Teemu Pukki – Norwich City – 2019–20, 2021–22
Aki Riihilahti – Crystal Palace – 2004–05
Teemu Tainio – Tottenham Hotspur, Sunderland, Birmingham City – 2005–10
Hannu Tihinen – West Ham United – 2000–01
Simo Valakari – Derby County – 2000–02

France 

Samassi Abou – West Ham United – 1997–99
Didier Agathe – Aston Villa – 2006–07
Naouirou Ahamada – Crystal Palace – 2022–
Ibrahim Amadou – Norwich City – 2019–20
Morgan Amalfitano – West Bromwich Albion, West Ham United – 2013–15
Jordan Amavi – Aston Villa – 2015–16
Jérémie Aliadière – Arsenal, West Ham United, Middlesbrough – 2001–09
Bernard Allou – Nottingham Forest – 1998–99
Pierre-Yves André – Bolton Wanderers – 2002–03
Nicolas Anelka – Arsenal, Liverpool, Manchester City, Bolton Wanderers, Chelsea, West Bromwich Albion – 1996–99, 2001–05, 2006–12, 2013–14
Alphonse Areola – Fulham, West Ham United – 2020–
Pegguy Arphexad – Leicester City, Liverpool – 1997–2000, 2001–02
Cédric Avinel – Watford – 2006–07
El Hadji Ba – Sunderland – 2013–14
Ibrahim Ba – Bolton Wanderers – 2003–04
Benoît Badiashile – Chelsea – 2022–
Tiémoué Bakayoko – Chelsea – 2017–18
Fabien Barthez – Manchester United – 2000–03
David Bellion – Sunderland, Manchester United, West Ham United – 2001–06
Hatem Ben Arfa – Newcastle United, Hull City – 2010–15
Olivier Bernard – Newcastle United, Southampton – 2001–05
Mathieu Berson – Aston Villa – 2004–05
Giulian Biancone – Nottingham Forest – 2022–
Laurent Blanc – Manchester United – 2001–03
Patrick Blondeau – Sheffield Wednesday – 1997–98
Thierry Bonalair – Nottingham Forest – 1998–99
Jérôme Bonnissel – Fulham – 2003–04
Alexandre Bonnot – Watford – 1999–2000
Jean-Alain Boumsong – Newcastle United – 2004–06
Yohan Cabaye – Newcastle United, Crystal Palace – 2011–14, 2015–18
Rémy Cabella – Newcastle United – 2014–15
Zoumana Camara – Leeds United – 2003–04
Vincent Candela – Bolton Wanderers – 2004–05
Eric Cantona – Leeds United, Manchester United – 1992–97
Étienne Capoue – Tottenham Hotspur, Watford – 2013–20
Patrice Carteron – Sunderland – 2000–01
Johan Cavalli – Watford – 2006–07
Cyril Chapuis – Leeds United – 2003–04
Laurent Charvet – Chelsea, Newcastle United, Manchester City – 1997–2001
Bruno Cheyrou – Liverpool – 2002–04
Pascal Chimbonda – Wigan Athletic, Tottenham Hotspur, Sunderland, Blackburn Rovers – 2005–11
Philippe Christanval – Fulham – 2005–08
Gérald Cid – Bolton Wanderers – 2007–08
Djibril Cissé – Liverpool, Sunderland, Queens Park Rangers – 2004–06, 2008–09, 2011–13
Édouard Cissé – West Ham United – 2002–03
Aly Cissokho – Liverpool, Aston Villa – 2013–16
Gaël Clichy – Arsenal, Manchester City – 2003–17
Patrick Colleter – Southampton – 1998–2000
Francis Coquelin – Arsenal – 2011–13, 2014–18
Laurent Courtois – West Ham United – 2001–02
Pascal Cygan – Arsenal – 2002–06
Ousmane Dabo – Manchester City – 2006–07
Olivier Dacourt – Everton, Leeds United, Fulham – 1998–99, 2000–03, 2008–09
Stéphane Dalmat – Tottenham Hotspur – 2003–04
Loïc Damour – Cardiff City – 2018–19
Jean-Claude Darcheville – Nottingham Forest – 1998–99
Mickaël Debève – Middlesbrough – 2001–02
Mathieu Debuchy – Newcastle United, Arsenal – 2012–17
Moussa Dembélé – Fulham – 2013–14
Marcel Desailly – Chelsea – 1998–2004
Didier Deschamps – Chelsea – 1999–2000
Abou Diaby – Arsenal – 2005–14
Adama Diakhaby – Huddersfield Town – 2018–19
Modibo Diakité – Sunderland – 2013–14
Ibrahima Diallo – Southampton – 2020–
Alou Diarra – West Ham United – 2012–13
Lassana Diarra – Chelsea, Arsenal, Portsmouth – 2005–09
Didier Digard – Middlesbrough – 2008–09
Lucas Digne – Everton, Aston Villa – 2018–
Bernard Diomède – Liverpool – 2000–01
Issa Diop – West Ham United, Fulham  – 2018–
Sylvain Distin – Newcastle United, Manchester City, Portsmouth, Everton, Bournemouth – 2001–16
Martin Djetou – Fulham, Bolton Wanderers – 2002–04, 2005–06
Youri Djorkaeff – Bolton Wanderers, Blackburn Rovers – 2001–05
Didier Domi – Newcastle United, Leeds United – 1998–2001, 2003–04
Pierre Ducrocq – Derby County – 2001–02
Christophe Dugarry – Birmingham City – 2002–04
Franck Dumas – Newcastle United – 1999–2000
Odsonne Édouard – Crystal Palace – 2021–
Mario Espartero – Bolton Wanderers – 2001–02
Patrice Evra – Manchester United, West Ham United – 2005–14, 2017–18
Julien Faubert – West Ham United – 2007–11
Fabrice Fernandes – Southampton, Bolton Wanderers – 2001–06
Jean-Michel Ferri – Liverpool – 1998–99
Mathieu Flamini – Arsenal, Crystal Palace – 2004–08, 2013–17
Wesley Fofana – Leicester City, Chelsea – 2020–
Marc-Antoine Fortuné – West Bromwich Albion – 2008–09, 2010–12
Dimitri Foulquier – Watford – 2019–20
William Gallas – Chelsea, Arsenal, Tottenham Hotspur – 2001–13
Rémi Garde – Arsenal – 1996–99
David Ginola – Newcastle United, Tottenham Hotspur, Aston Villa, Everton – 1995–2002
Olivier Giroud – Arsenal, Chelsea – 2012–21
Gaël Givet – Blackburn Rovers – 2008–12
Alain Goma – Newcastle United, Fulham – 1999–2006
Bafétimbi Gomis – Swansea City – 2014–16
Yoan Gouffran – Newcastle United – 2012–16
Hérold Goulon – Blackburn Rovers – 2010–11
Elliot Grandin – Blackpool – 2010–11
Xavier Gravelaine – Watford – 1999–2000
François Grenet – Derby County – 2001–02
Léandre Griffit – Southampton – 2003–05
Gilles Grimandi – Arsenal – 1997–2002
David Grondin – Arsenal – 1998–99
Matteo Guendouzi – Arsenal – 2018–20
Frédéric Guilbert – Aston Villa – 2019–20
Stéphane Guivarc'h – Newcastle United – 1998–99
Thierry Henry – Arsenal – 1999–2007, 2011–12
Valérien Ismaël – Crystal Palace – 1997–98
Younès Kaboul – Tottenham Hotspur, Portsmouth, Sunderland, Watford – 2007–18
Boubacar Kamara – Aston Villa – 2022–
N'Golo Kanté – Leicester City, Chelsea – 2015–
Olivier Kapo – Birmingham City, Wigan Athletic – 2007–10
Christian Karembeu – Middlesbrough – 2000–01
Marc Keller – West Ham United – 1998–2000
Yann Kermorgant – Bournemouth – 2015–16
Anthony Knockaert – Leicester City, Brighton & Hove Albion – 2014–15, 2017–19
Ibrahima Konaté – Liverpool – 2021–
Laurent Koscielny – Arsenal – 2010–19
Layvin Kurzawa – Fulham – 2022–
Alexandre Lacazette – Arsenal – 2017–22
Bernard Lama – West Ham United – 1997–98
Bernard Lambourde – Chelsea – 1997–2001
Lilian Laslandes – Sunderland – 2001–02
Pierre Laurent – Leeds United – 1996–97
Florent Laville – Bolton Wanderers – 2002–04
Maxime Le Marchand – Fulham – 2018–19, 2020–21
Ulrich Le Pen – Ipswich Town – 2001–02
Anthony Le Tallec – Liverpool, Sunderland – 2003–06
Frank Leboeuf – Chelsea – 1996–2001
Pierre Lees-Melou – Norwich City – 2021–22
Sylvain Legwinski – Fulham – 2001–06
Florian Lejeune – Newcastle United – 2017–20
Clément Lenglet – Tottenham Hotspur – 2022–
Hugo Lloris – Tottenham Hotspur – 2012–
Matthieu Louis-Jean – Nottingham Forest – 1998–99
Patrice Luzi – Liverpool – 2003–04
Mickaël Madar – Everton – 1997–99
Claude Makélélé – Chelsea – 2003–08
Steed Malbranque – Fulham, Tottenham Hotspur, Sunderland – 2001–11
Florent Malouda – Chelsea – 2007–13
Steve Mandanda – Crystal Palace – 2016–17
Mikael Mandron – Sunderland – 2012–13, 2014–15
Eliaquim Mangala – Manchester City, Everton – 2014–16, 2017–18
Sékou Mara – Southampton – 2022–
Steve Marlet – Fulham – 2001–04
Anthony Martial – Manchester United – 2015–
Lilian Martin – Derby County – 2000–01
Sylvain Marveaux – Newcastle United – 2011–14
Jean-Philippe Mateta – Crystal Palace – 2020–
Neal Maupay – Brighton & Hove Albion, Everton – 2019–
Youl Mawéné – Derby County – 2000–02
Benjamin Mendy – Manchester City – 2017–22
Bernard Mendy – Bolton Wanderers, Hull City – 2002–03, 2008–10
Illan Meslier – Leeds United – 2020–
Anthony Modeste – Blackburn Rovers – 2011–12
Lys Mousset – Bournemouth, Sheffield United  – 2016–21
Steven Mouyokolo – Hull City, Wolverhampton Wanderers – 2009–11
Yann M'Vila – Sunderland – 2015–16
Christian Nadé – Sheffield United – 2006–07
Lilian Nalis – Leicester City – 2003–04
Samir Nasri – Arsenal, Manchester City, West Ham United – 2008–17, 2018–19
Tanguy Ndombele – Tottenham Hotspur – 2019–22
Christian Negouai – Manchester City – 2004–05
David N'Gog – Liverpool, Bolton Wanderers, Swansea City – 2008–12, 2013–14
Bruno Ngotty – Bolton Wanderers – 2001–06
Moussa Niakhaté – Nottingham Forest – 2022–
Niels Nkounkou – Everton – 2020–21
Charles N'Zogbia – Newcastle United, Wigan Athletic, Aston Villa – 2004–13, 2014–16
Steven Nzonzi – Blackburn Rovers, Stoke City – 2009–15
Gabriel Obertan – Manchester United, Newcastle United – 2009–16
Michael Olise – Crystal Palace – 2021–
Noé Pamarot – Tottenham Hotspur, Portsmouth – 2004–09
Dimitri Payet – West Ham United – 2015–17
Lionel Pérez – Sunderland – 1996–97
Sébastien Pérez – Blackburn Rovers – 1998–99
Vincent Péricard – Portsmouth, Stoke City – 2003–04, 2005–06, 2008–09
Romain Perraud – Southampton – 2021–
Emmanuel Petit – Arsenal, Chelsea – 1997–2000, 2001–04
Jérémy Pied – Southampton – 2016–18
Frédéric Piquionne – Portsmouth, West Ham United – 2009–11
Robert Pires – Arsenal, Aston Villa – 2000–06, 2010–11
Damien Plessis – Liverpool – 2007–09
Paul Pogba – Manchester United – 2011–12, 2016–22
William Prunier – Manchester United – 1995–96
Sébastien Puygrenier – Bolton Wanderers – 2008–09
Franck Queudrue – Middlesbrough, Fulham, Birmingham City – 2001–08, 2009–10
Loïc Rémy – Queens Park Rangers, Newcastle United, Chelsea, Crystal Palace – 2012–17
Anthony Réveillère – Sunderland – 2014–15
Emmanuel Rivière – Newcastle United – 2014–16
Laurent Robert – Newcastle United, Portsmouth, Derby County – 2001–06, 2007–08
Bruno Rodriguez – Bradford City – 1999–2000
Franck Rolling – Leicester City – 1996–97
Eric Roy – Sunderland – 1999–2001
Georginio Rutter – Leeds United – 2022–
Bacary Sagna – Arsenal, Manchester City – 2007–17
Yaya Sanogo – Arsenal, Crystal Palace – 2013–15
Louis Saha – Newcastle United, Fulham, Manchester United, Everton, Tottenham Hotspur, Sunderland – 1998–99, 2001–13
Allan Saint-Maximin – Newcastle United – 2019–
Mamadou Sakho – Liverpool, Crystal Palace – 2013–21
William Saliba – Arsenal – 2022–
Morgan Sanson – Aston Villa – 2020–23
Malang Sarr – Chelsea – 2021–22
Sébastien Schemmel – West Ham United, Portsmouth – 2000–04
Morgan Schneiderlin – Southampton, Manchester United, Everton – 2012–20
Antoine Sibierski – Manchester City, Newcastle United, Wigan Athletic – 2003–09
Djibril Sidibé – Everton – 2019–20
Mikaël Silvestre – Manchester United, Arsenal – 1999–2010
Florent Sinama Pongolle – Liverpool, Blackburn Rovers – 2003–06
Moussa Sissoko – Newcastle United, Tottenham Hotspur, Watford – 2012–22
David Sommeil – Manchester City, Sheffield United – 2002–07
Boubakary Soumaré – Leicester City – 2021–
Sébastien Squillaci – Arsenal – 2010–12
Benjamin Stambouli – Tottenham Hotspur – 2014–15
Ludovic Sylvestre – Blackpool – 2010–11
Allan Tchaptchet – Southampton – 2020–21
David Terrier – West Ham United – 1997–98
Florian Thauvin – Newcastle United – 2015–16
Kévin Théophile-Catherine – Cardiff City – 2013–14
Patrick Valéry – Blackburn Rovers – 1997–98
Raphaël Varane – Manchester United – 2021–
Jordan Veretout – Aston Villa – 2015–16
Patrick Vieira – Arsenal, Manchester City – 1996–2005, 2009–11
Grégory Vignal – Liverpool, Portsmouth, Birmingham City – 2000–03, 2005–06, 2009–10
Jean-Guy Wallemme – Coventry City – 1998–99
Sylvain Wiltord – Arsenal – 2000–04
Mapou Yanga-Mbiwa – Newcastle United – 2012–14
Kurt Zouma – Chelsea, Stoke City, Everton, West Ham United – 2014–
Ronald Zubar – Wolverhampton Wanderers – 2009–12

Georgia 
Rati Aleksidze – Chelsea – 2000–01
Mikhail Kavelashvili – Manchester City – 1995–96
Temuri Ketsbaia – Newcastle United – 1997–2000
Zurab Khizanishvili – Blackburn Rovers – 2005–09
Georgi Kinkladze – Manchester City, Derby County – 1995–96, 1999–2002

Germany 

Markus Babbel – Liverpool, Blackburn Rovers – 2000–04
Michael Ballack – Chelsea – 2006–10
Stefan Beinlich – Aston Villa – 1992–94
Armel Bella-Kotchap – Southampton – 2022–
Jérôme Boateng – Manchester City – 2010–11
Fredi Bobic – Bolton Wanderers – 2001–02
Matthias Breitkreutz – Aston Villa – 1992–94
Emre Can – Liverpool – 2014–18
Sean Dundee – Liverpool – 1998–99
Erik Durm  – Huddersfield Town – 2018–19
Ralf Fährmann – Norwich City – 2019–20
Steffen Freund – Tottenham Hotspur, Leicester City – 1998–2004
Michael Frontzeck – Manchester City – 1995–96
Maurizio Gaudino – Manchester City – 1994–95
Serge Gnabry – Arsenal, West Bromwich Albion – 2012–14, 2015–16
Pascal Groß – Brighton & Hove Albion – 2017–
İlkay Gündoğan – Manchester City – 2016–
Dietmar Hamann – Newcastle United, Liverpool, Manchester City – 1998–2009
Kai Havertz – Chelsea – 2020–
Michael Hefele  – Huddersfield Town – 2017–18
Thomas Helmer – Sunderland – 1999–2000
Thomas Hitzlsperger – Aston Villa, West Ham United, Everton – 2000–05, 2010–11, 2012–13
Lewis Holtby – Tottenham Hotspur, Fulham – 2012–15
Uwe Hünemeier – Brighton & Hove Albion – 2017–18
Robert Huth – Chelsea, Middlesbrough, Stoke City, Leicester City – 2001–17
Eike Immel – Manchester City – 1995–96
Vitaly Janelt – Brentford – 2021–
Loris Karius – Liverpool – 2016–18
Steffen Karl – Manchester City – 1993–94
Thilo Kehrer – West Ham United – 2022–
Reda Khadra – Brighton & Hove Albion – 2020–21
Jan Kirchhoff – Sunderland – 2015–17
Jürgen Klinsmann – Tottenham Hotspur – 1994–95, 1997–98
Robin Koch – Leeds United – 2020–
Lars Leese – Barnsley – 1997–98
Jens Lehmann – Arsenal – 2003–08, 2010–11
Moritz Leitner – Norwich City – 2019–20
Bernd Leno – Arsenal, Fulham – 2018–
Chris Löwe – Huddersfield Town – 2017–19
Stefan Malz – Arsenal – 1999–2001
Marko Marin – Chelsea – 2012–13
Alberto Méndez – Arsenal – 1997–99
Per Mertesacker – Arsenal – 2011–18
Max Meyer – Crystal Palace – 2018–20
Shkodran Mustafi – Arsenal – 2016–21
Lukas Nmecha – Manchester City – 2017–18
Savio Nsereko – West Ham United – 2008–09
Mesut Özil – Arsenal – 2013–20
Sergio Peter – Blackburn Rovers – 2005–07
Lukas Podolski – Arsenal – 2012–15
Nick Proschwitz – Hull City – 2013–14
Collin Quaner – Huddersfield Town – 2017–19
Karl-Heinz Riedle – Liverpool – 1997–2000
Sascha Riether – Fulham – 2012–14
Uwe Rösler – Manchester City, Southampton – 1993–96, 2000–02
Antonio Rüdiger – Chelsea – 2017–22
Lukas Rupp – Norwich City – 2019–20, 2021–22
Leroy Sané – Manchester City – 2016–19
Kevin Schade – Brentford – 2022–
Christopher Schindler – Huddersfield Town – 2017–19
Stefan Schnoor – Derby County – 1998–2001
André Schürrle – Chelsea, Fulham – 2013–15, 2018–19
Bastian Schweinsteiger – Manchester United – 2015–16
Lennard Sowah – Portsmouth – 2009–10
Dennis Srbeny – Norwich City – 2019–20
Marco Stiepermann – Norwich City – 2019–20
Michael Tarnat – Manchester City – 2003–04
Gerhard Tremmel – Swansea City – 2011–15
Tom Trybull – Norwich City – 2019–20
Deniz Undav – Brighton & Hove Albion – 2022–
Moritz Volz – Fulham – 2003–08
Timo Werner – Chelsea – 2020–22
Stefan Wessels – Everton – 2007–08
Philipp Wollscheid – Stoke City – 2014–17
Christian Ziege – Middlesbrough, Liverpool, Tottenham Hotspur – 1999–2004
Ron-Robert Zieler – Leicester City – 2016–17
Christoph Zimmermann – Norwich City – 2019–20, 2021–22

Gibraltar 
Danny Higginbotham – Manchester United, Derby County, Southampton, Sunderland, Stoke City – 1999–2005, 2007–12

Greece 
George Baldock – Sheffield United – 2019–21
Angelos Basinas – Portsmouth – 2008–10
Vassilios Borbokis – Derby County – 1998–2000
Kostas Chalkias – Portsmouth – 2004–05
Nikos Dabizas – Newcastle United, Leicester City – 1997–2004
Giorgos Donis – Blackburn Rovers – 1996–97
Theofanis Gekas – Portsmouth – 2008–09
Georgios Georgiadis – Newcastle United – 1998–99
Stelios Giannakopoulos – Bolton Wanderers, Hull City – 2003–09
Dimitris Giannoulis – Norwich City – 2021–22
José Holebas – Watford – 2015–20
Giorgos Karagounis – Fulham – 2012–14
Orestis Karnezis – Watford – 2017–18
Kostas Konstantinidis – Bolton Wanderers – 2001–02
Sotirios Kyrgiakos – Liverpool, Sunderland – 2009–12
Vassilis Lakis – Crystal Palace – 2004–05
Charalampos Mavrias – Sunderland – 2013–14
Konstantinos Mavropanos – Arsenal – 2017–19
Kostas Mitroglou – Fulham – 2013–14
Vangelis Moras – Swansea City – 2011–12
Sokratis Papastathopoulos – Arsenal – 2018–20
Georgios Samaras – Manchester City, West Bromwich Albion – 2005–08, 2014–15
Giannis Skopelitis – Portsmouth – 2004–06
Kostas Stafylidis – Stoke City – 2017–18
Stathis Tavlaridis – Arsenal – 2002–03
Kostas Tsimikas – Liverpool – 2020–
Christos Tzolis – Norwich City – 2021–22
Apostolos Vellios – Everton – 2010–13
Theodoros Zagorakis – Leicester City – 1997–2000

Hungary 
Ádám Bogdán – Bolton Wanderers, Liverpool – 2010–12, 2015–16
Ákos Buzsáky – Queens Park Rangers – 2011–12
Márton Fülöp – Sunderland, Manchester City, West Bromwich Albion – 2007–10, 2011–12
Zoltán Gera – West Bromwich Albion, Fulham –  2004–06, 2008–14
Péter Halmosi – Hull City – 2008–09
Gábor Király – Crystal Palace, Aston Villa – 2004–05, 2006–07
István Kozma – Liverpool – 1992–93
Péter Kurucz – West Ham United – 2009–10
Tamás Priskin – Watford – 2006–07
Sándor Torghelle – Crystal Palace – 2004–05

Iceland 
Guðni Bergsson – Tottenham Hotspur, Bolton Wanderers – 1992–93, 1995–96, 1997–98, 2001–03
Eiður Guðjohnsen – Chelsea, Tottenham Hotspur, Stoke City, Fulham – 2000–06, 2009–11
Joey Guðjónsson – Aston Villa, Wolverhampton Wanderers, Burnley – 2002–04, 2009–10
Þórður Guðjónsson – Derby County – 2000–01
Jóhann Berg Guðmundsson – Burnley – 2016–22
Jóhann Birnir Guðmundsson – Watford – 1999–2000
Aron Gunnarsson – Cardiff City – 2013–14, 2018–19
Brynjar Gunnarsson – Reading – 2006–08
Arnar Gunnlaugsson – Bolton Wanderers, Leicester City – 1997–2002
Heiðar Helguson – Watford, Fulham, Bolton Wanderers, Queens Park Rangers – 1999–2000, 2005–09, 2011–12
Hermann Hreiðarsson – Crystal Palace, Wimbledon, Ipswich Town, Charlton Athletic, Portsmouth – 1997–98, 1999–2002, 2003–10
Ívar Ingimarsson – Reading – 2006–08
Eggert Jónsson – Wolverhampton Wanderers – 2011–12
Þorvaldur Örlygsson – Nottingham Forest – 1992–93
Rúnar Alex Rúnarsson – Arsenal – 2020–21
Gylfi Sigurðsson – Swansea City, Tottenham Hotspur, Everton – 2011–21
Lárus Sigurðsson – West Bromwich Albion – 2002–03
Grétar Steinsson – Bolton Wanderers – 2007–12

Israel 
Walid Badir – Wimbledon – 1999–2000
Yossi Benayoun – West Ham United, Liverpool, Chelsea, Arsenal – 2005–13
Tal Ben Haim – Bolton Wanderers, Chelsea, Manchester City, Sunderland, Portsmouth, West Ham United, Queens Park Rangers – 2004–11, 2012–13
Eyal Berkovic – Southampton, West Ham United, Manchester City, Portsmouth – 1996–99, 2002–05
Tamir Cohen – Bolton Wanderers – 2007–11
Najwan Ghrayib – Aston Villa – 1999–2000
Tomer Hemed – Brighton & Hove Albion – 2017–18
Yaniv Katan – West Ham United – 2005–06
Beram Kayal – Brighton & Hove Albion – 2017–19
Dekel Keinan – Blackpool – 2010–11
Avi Nimni – Derby County – 1999–2000
Ronny Rosenthal – Liverpool, Tottenham Hotspur – 1992–97
Ben Sahar – Chelsea – 2006–07
Itay Shechter – Swansea City – 2012–13
Manor Solomon – Fulham – 2022–
Idan Tal – Everton, Bolton Wanderers – 2000–02, 2006–07
Itzik Zohar – Crystal Palace – 1997–98

Italy 

Gabriele Ambrosetti – Chelsea – 1999–2000
Marco Ambrosio – Chelsea – 2003–04
Lorenzo Amoruso – Blackburn Rovers – 2003–05
Alberto Aquilani – Liverpool – 2009–10
Dino Baggio – Blackburn Rovers – 2003–04
Francesco Baiano – Derby County – 1997–2000
Mario Balotelli – Manchester City, Liverpool – 2010–13, 2014–15
Antonio Barreca  – Newcastle United – 2018–19
Nicola Berti – Tottenham Hotspur – 1997–99
Rolando Bianchi – Manchester City – 2007–08
Patrizio Billio – Crystal Palace – 1997–98
Ivano Bonetti – Crystal Palace – 1997–98
Fabio Borini – Chelsea, Liverpool, Sunderland – 2009–10, 2012–17
Marco Borriello – West Ham United – 2013–14
Marco Branca – Middlesbrough – 1998–99
Benito Carbone – Sheffield Wednesday, Aston Villa, Bradford City, Derby County, Middlesbrough – 1996–2002
Pierluigi Casiraghi – Chelsea – 1998–99
Bernardo Corradi – Manchester City – 2006–07
Carlo Cudicini – Chelsea, Tottenham Hotspur – 1999–2011
Patrick Cutrone – Wolverhampton Wanderers – 2019–21
Daniele Daino – Derby County – 2001–02
Samuele Dalla Bona – Chelsea – 1999–2002
Matteo Darmian – Manchester United – 2015–19
Paolo Di Canio – Sheffield Wednesday, West Ham United, Charlton Athletic – 1997–2004
Roberto Di Matteo – Chelsea – 1996–2001
David Di Michele – West Ham United – 2008–09
Alessandro Diamanti – West Ham United, Watford – 2008–10, 2015–16
Andrea Dossena – Liverpool, Sunderland – 2008–10, 2013–14
Emerson – Chelsea, West Ham United – 2017–
Stefano Eranio – Derby County – 1997–2001
Matteo Ferrari – Everton – 2005–06
Gianluca Festa – Middlesbrough – 1996–97, 1998–2002
Manolo Gabbiadini – Southampton – 2016–19
Emanuele Giaccherini – Sunderland – 2013–15
Stefano Gioacchini – Coventry City – 1998–99
Wilfried Gnonto – Leeds United – 2022–
Corrado Grabbi – Blackburn Rovers – 2001–04
Jorginho – Chelsea, Arsenal – 2018–
Moise Kean – Everton – 2019–22
Attilio Lombardo – Crystal Palace – 1997–98
Arturo Lupoli – Arsenal – 2005–06
Massimo Maccarone – Middlesbrough – 2002–04, 2005–07
Federico Macheda – Manchester United, Queens Park Rangers – 2008–12
Roberto Mancini – Leicester City – 2000–01
Vito Mannone – Arsenal, Sunderland – 2008–10, 2012–17
Dario Marcolin – Blackburn Rovers – 1998–99
Marco Materazzi – Everton – 1998–99
Vincenzo Montella – Fulham – 2006–07
Antonio Nocerino – West Ham United – 2013–14
Angelo Ogbonna – West Ham United – 2015–
Stefano Okaka – Fulham, Watford – 2009–10, 2016–19
Dani Osvaldo – Southampton – 2013–15
Daniele Padelli – Liverpool – 2006–07
Michele Padovano – Crystal Palace – 1997–98
Gabriel Paletta – Liverpool – 2006–07
Alberto Paloschi – Swansea City – 2015–16
Christian Panucci – Chelsea – 2000–01
Graziano Pellè – Southampton – 2014–16
Alessandro Pistone – Newcastle United, Everton – 1997–2006
Rodrigo Possebon – Manchester United – 2008–09
Andrea Ranocchia – Hull City – 2016–17
Fabrizio Ravanelli – Middlesbrough, Derby County – 1996–97, 2001–02
Giuseppe Rossi – Manchester United, Newcastle United – 2005–07
Francesco Sanetti – Sheffield Wednesday – 1997–99
Davide Santon – Newcastle United – 2011–14
Gianluca Scamacca – West Ham United – 2022–
Ezequiel Schelotto – Brighton & Hove Albion – 2017–18, 2019–20
Matteo Sereni – Ipswich Town – 2001–02
Andrea Silenzi – Nottingham Forest – 1995–97
Massimo Taibi – Manchester United – 1999–2000
Paolo Tramezzani – Tottenham Hotspur – 1998–99
Marcello Trotta – Fulham – 2011–12
Nicola Ventola – Crystal Palace – 2004–05
Gianluca Vialli – Chelsea – 1996–99
Davide Zappacosta – Chelsea – 2017–19
Simone Zaza – West Ham United – 2016–17
Gianfranco Zola – Chelsea – 1996–2003

Kosovo 
Bersant Celina – Manchester City – 2015–16
Florent Hadergjonaj – Huddersfield Town – 2017–19
Milot Rashica – Norwich City – 2021–22

Latvia 
Imants Bleidelis – Southampton – 2000–02
Kaspars Gorkšs – Reading – 2012–13
Marians Pahars – Southampton – 1998–2004
Igors Stepanovs – Arsenal – 2000–03
Andrejs Štolcers – Fulham – 2001–03

Lithuania 
Giedrius Arlauskis – Watford – 2015–16
Tomas Danilevičius – Arsenal – 2000–01

Malta 
Dylan Kerr – Leeds United – 1992–93

Montenegro 
Stevan Jovetić – Manchester City – 2013–15
Stefan Savić – Manchester City – 2011–12
Simon Vukčević – Blackburn Rovers – 2011–12
Elsad Zverotić – Fulham – 2013–14

Netherlands 

Patrick van Aanholt – Chelsea, Wigan Athletic, Sunderland, Crystal Palace – 2009–10, 2011–12, 2014–21
Nabil Abidallah – Ipswich Town – 2000–01
Ibrahim Afellay – Stoke City – 2015–18
Nathan Aké – Chelsea, Watford, Bournemouth, Manchester City – 2012–
Ryan Babel – Liverpool, Fulham – 2007–11, 2018–19
Donny van de Beek – Manchester United, Everton – 2020–
Steven Berghuis – Watford – 2015–16
Dennis Bergkamp – Arsenal – 1995–2006
Steven Bergwijn – Tottenham Hotspur – 2019–22
Daley Blind – Manchester United – 2014–18
Regi Blinker – Sheffield Wednesday – 1995–97
George Boateng – Coventry City, Aston Villa, Middlesbrough, Hull City – 1997–2010
Jeroen Boere – West Ham United – 1993–96
Winston Bogarde – Chelsea – 2000–01
Marco Boogers – West Ham United – 1995–96
Paul Bosvelt – Manchester City – 2003–05
Sven Botman – Newcastle United – 2022–
Khalid Boulahrouz – Chelsea – 2006–07
Wilfred Bouma – Aston Villa – 2005–08
Giovanni van Bronckhorst – Arsenal – 2001–03
Jeffrey Bruma – Chelsea – 2009–11
Alexander Büttner – Manchester United – 2012–14
Tahith Chong – Manchester United – 2018–20
Jordy Clasie – Southampton – 2015–17
Jordi Cruyff – Manchester United – 1996–2000
Arnaut Danjuma – Bournemouth, Tottenham Hotspur – 2019–20, 2022–
Chris David – Fulham – 2013–14
Edgar Davids – Tottenham Hotspur – 2005–07
Memphis Depay – Manchester United – 2015–17
Virgil van Dijk – Southampton, Liverpool – 2015–
Sieb Dijkstra – Queens Park Rangers – 1994–95
Royston Drenthe – Everton – 2011–12
Anwar El Ghazi – Aston Villa, Everton – 2019–22
Eljero Elia – Southampton – 2014–15
Urby Emanuelson – Fulham – 2012–13
Marvin Emnes – Middlesbrough, Swansea City – 2008–09, 2013–16
Leroy Fer – Norwich City, Queens Park Rangers, Swansea City – 2013–18
Timothy Fosu-Mensah – Manchester United, Crystal Palace, Fulham – 2015–21
Fabian de Freitas – Bolton Wanderers – 1995–96
Cody Gakpo – Liverpool – 2022–
Marco van Ginkel – Chelsea, Stoke City – 2013–14, 2015–16
Ulrich van Gobbel – Southampton – 1996–98
Ed de Goey – Chelsea – 1997–2003
Raimond van der Gouw – Manchester United – 1996–2002
Alfons Groenendijk – Manchester City – 1993–94
Ruud Gullit – Chelsea – 1995–98
Jonathan de Guzmán – Swansea City – 2012–14
Jimmy Floyd Hasselbaink – Leeds United, Chelsea, Middlesbrough, Charlton Athletic – 1997–99, 2000–07
Jan Paul van Hecke – Brighton & Hove Albion – 2022–
John Heitinga – Everton, Fulham – 2009–14
Glenn Helder – Arsenal – 1994–97
Laurens ten Heuvel – Barnsley – 1997–98
Wesley Hoedt – Southampton – 2017–19
Ki-Jana Hoever – Wolverhampton Wanderers – 2020–22
Pierre van Hooijdonk – Nottingham Forest – 1996–97, 1998–99
Jos Hooiveld – Southampton – 2012–14
Mike van der Hoorn – Swansea City – 2016–18
Daryl Janmaat – Newcastle United, Watford – 2014–20
Vincent Janssen – Tottenham Hotspur – 2016–19
Collins John – Fulham – 2003–08
Luuk de Jong – Newcastle United – 2013–14
Nigel de Jong – Manchester City – 2008–13
Siem de Jong – Newcastle United – 2014–16
Wim Jonk – Sheffield Wednesday – 1998–2000
John Karelse – Newcastle United – 1999–2000
Orpheo Keizerweerd – Oldham Athletic – 1992–93
Davy Klaassen – Everton – 2017–18
Patrick Kluivert – Newcastle United – 2004–05
Terence Kongolo – Huddersfield Town, Fulham – 2017–19, 2020–21
Willem Korsten – Leeds United, Tottenham Hotspur – 1998–2001
Jan Kromkamp – Liverpool – 2005–06
Tim Krul – Newcastle United, Norwich City – 2010–16, 2019–20, 2021–22
Dirk Kuyt – Liverpool – 2006–12
Robin van der Laan – Derby County – 1996–98
Denny Landzaat – Wigan Athletic – 2006–08
Rajiv van La Parra – Huddersfield Town – 2017–19
Jeremain Lens – Sunderland – 2015–17
Jürgen Locadia – Brighton & Hove Albion – 2017–20, 2021–22
Sherjill MacDonald – West Bromwich Albion – 2008–09
Tyrell Malacia – Manchester United – 2022–
Bruno Martins Indi – Stoke City – 2016–18
Erik Meijer – Liverpool – 1999–2001
Mario Melchiot – Chelsea, Birmingham City, Wigan Athletic – 1999–2006, 2007–09
Andy van der Meyde – Everton – 2005–07, 2008–09
Robert Molenaar – Leeds United, Bradford City – 1996–99, 2000–01
Ken Monkou – Southampton – 1992–99
Kiki Musampa – Manchester City – 2004–06
Riga Mustapha – Bolton Wanderers – 2008–10
Luciano Narsingh – Swansea City – 2016–18
Luc Nijholt – Swindon Town – 1993–94
Ruud van Nistelrooy – Manchester United – 2001–06
André Ooijer – Blackburn Rovers – 2006–09
Marc Overmars – Arsenal – 1997–2000
Robin van Persie – Arsenal, Manchester United – 2004–15
Bobby Petta – Fulham – 2003–04
Erik Pieters – Stoke City, Burnley – 2013–18, 2019–22
Stefan Postma – Aston Villa – 2002–05
Davy Pröpper – Brighton & Hove Albion – 2017–21
Michael Reiziger – Middlesbrough – 2004–06
Karim Rekik – Manchester City – 2012–13
Martijn Reuser – Ipswich Town – 2000–02
Daniël de Ridder – Birmingham City, Wigan Athletic – 2007–09
Jaïro Riedewald – Crystal Palace – 2017–18, 2019–
Maceo Rigters – Blackburn Rovers – 2007–08
Arjen Robben – Chelsea – 2004–07
Marten de Roon – Middlesbrough – 2016–17
Bryan Roy – Nottingham Forest – 1994–97
Edwin van der Sar – Fulham, Manchester United – 2001–11
Hans Segers – Wimbledon, Tottenham Hotspur – 1992–96, 1998–99
Gerald Sibon – Sheffield Wednesday – 1999–2000
Richard Sneekes – Bolton Wanderers – 1995–96
Jaap Stam – Manchester United – 1998–2002
Ronnie Stam – Wigan Athletic – 2010–13
Maarten Stekelenburg – Fulham, Southampton, Everton – 2013–14, 2015–17
Pascal Struijk – Leeds United – 2020–
Crysencio Summerville – Leeds United – 2021–
Kenny Tete – Fulham – 2020–21, 2022–
Dwight Tiendalli – Swansea City – 2012–15
Orlando Trustfull – Sheffield Wednesday – 1996–97
Rafael van der Vaart – Tottenham Hotspur – 2010–13
Joël Veltman – Brighton & Hove Albion – 2020–
Jan Vennegoor of Hesselink – Hull City – 2009–10
Ron Vlaar – Aston Villa — 2012–15
Michel Vonk – Manchester City – 1992–95
Michel Vorm – Swansea City, Tottenham Hotspur – 2011–19
Dorus de Vries – Wolverhampton Wanderers – 2011–12
Harald Wapenaar – Portsmouth – 2003–04
Wout Weghorst – Burnley, Manchester United – 2021–
Sander Westerveld – Liverpool, Portsmouth, Everton – 1999–2002, 2005–06
Gerard Wiekens – Manchester City – 2000–01, 2002–03
Georginio Wijnaldum – Newcastle United, Liverpool – 2015–21
Clyde Wijnhard – Leeds United – 1998–99
Jetro Willems – Newcastle United – 2019–20
Ron Willems – Derby County – 1996–98
Fabian Wilnis – Ipswich Town – 2000–02
Richard Witschge – Blackburn Rovers – 1994–95
Ricky van Wolfswinkel – Norwich City – 2013–14
Nordin Wooter – Watford – 1999–2000
Marvin Zeegelaar – Watford – 2017–18
Arjan de Zeeuw – Barnsley, Portsmouth, Wigan Athletic – 1997–98, 2003–07
Boudewijn Zenden – Chelsea, Middlesbrough, Liverpool, Sunderland – 2001–07, 2009–11
Richairo Zivkovic – Sheffield United – 2019–20
Gianni Zuiverloon – West Bromwich Albion – 2008–09, 2010–11

North Macedonia 
Ezgjan Alioski – Leeds United – 2020–21
Gjorgji Hristov – Barnsley – 1997–98
Goran Popov – West Bromwich Albion – 2012–14
Artim Šakiri – West Bromwich Albion – 2004–05
Goce Sedloski – Sheffield Wednesday – 1997–98

Norway 

Kristoffer Ajer – Brentford – 2021–
Trond Andersen – Wimbledon – 1999–2000
Martin Andresen – Wimbledon, Blackburn Rovers – 1999–2000, 2003–04
Espen Baardsen – Tottenham Hotspur, Everton – 1996–99, 2002–03
Eirik Bakke – Leeds United, Aston Villa – 1999–2004, 2005–06
Henning Berg – Blackburn Rovers, Manchester United – 1992–2003
Sander Berge – Sheffield United – 2019–21
Jo Inge Berget – Cardiff City – 2013–14
Stig Inge Bjørnebye – Liverpool, Blackburn Rovers – 1992–99, 2001–02
Lars Bohinen – Nottingham Forest, Blackburn Rovers, Derby County – 1994–2001
Daniel Braaten – Bolton Wanderers – 2007–08
Bjørn Otto Bragstad – Derby County – 2000–01
John Carew – Aston Villa, Stoke City – 2006–11
Mats Møller Dæhli – Cardiff City – 2013–14
Adama Diomande – Hull City – 2016–17
Magnus Wolff Eikrem – Cardiff City – 2013–14
Omar Elabdellaoui – Hull City – 2016–17
Mohamed Elyounoussi – Southampton – 2018–19, 2021–
Jan Åge Fjørtoft – Swindon Town, Middlesbrough, Barnsley – 1993–94, 1995–98
Jostein Flo – Sheffield United – 1993–94
Tore André Flo – Chelsea, Sunderland – 1997–2001, 2002–03
Frode Grodås – Chelsea – 1996–97
Alfie Haaland – Nottingham Forest, Leeds United, Manchester City – 1994–2001
Erling Haaland – Manchester City – 2022–
Kristofer Hæstad – Wigan Athletic – 2006–07
Erik Hagen – Wigan Athletic – 2007–08
Gunnar Halle – Oldham Athletic, Leeds United, Bradford City – 1992–94, 1996–2001
Brede Hangeland – Fulham, Crystal Palace – 2007–16
Vegard Heggem – Liverpool – 1998–2001
Markus Henriksen – Hull City – 2016–17
Jon Olav Hjelde – Nottingham Forest – 1998–99
Leo Hjelde – Leeds United – 2021–22
Abdisalam Ibrahim – Manchester City – 2009–10
Kåre Ingebrigtsen – Manchester City – 1992–94
Steffen Iversen – Tottenham Hotspur, Wolverhampton Wanderers – 1996–2004
Stefan Johansen – Fulham – 2018–19
Stig Johansen – Southampton – 1997–98
Erland Johnsen – Chelsea – 1992–97
Ronny Johnsen – Manchester United, Aston Villa, Newcastle United – 1996–2005
Christian Kalvenes – Burnley – 2009–10
Azar Karadas – Portsmouth – 2005–06
Joshua King – Bournemouth, Everton, Watford – 2015–22
Kristoffer Klaesson – Leeds United – 2021–
Bjørn Tore Kvarme – Liverpool – 1996–99
Øyvind Leonhardsen – Wimbledon, Liverpool, Tottenham Hotspur, Aston Villa – 1994–2003
Andreas Lund – Wimbledon – 1999–2000
Claus Lundekvam – Southampton – 1996–2005
Pål Lydersen – Arsenal – 1992–93
Thomas Myhre – Everton, Sunderland, Charlton Athletic – 1997–2001, 2002–03, 2005–07
Erik Nevland – Manchester United, Fulham – 1997–98, 2007–10
Roger Nilsen – Sheffield United, Tottenham Hotspur – 1993–94, 1998–99
Håvard Nordtveit – West Ham United, Fulham – 2016–17, 2018–19
Mathias Normann – Norwich City – 2021–22
Runar Normann – Coventry City – 1999–2000
Ørjan Nyland – Aston Villa – 2019–20
Martin Ødegaard – Arsenal – 2020–
Egil Østenstad – Southampton, Manchester City, Blackburn Rovers – 1996–2003
Jonathan Parr – Crystal Palace – 2013–14
Morten Gamst Pedersen – Blackburn Rovers – 2004–12
Tore Pedersen – Oldham Athletic, Blackburn Rovers, Wimbledon – 1993–94, 1997–98, 1999–2000
Bjørn Helge Riise – Fulham – 2009–11
John Arne Riise – Liverpool, Fulham – 2001–08, 2011–14
Petter Rudi – Sheffield Wednesday – 1997–2000
Ståle Solbakken – Wimbledon – 1997–98
Ole Gunnar Solskjær – Manchester United – 1996–2004, 2005–07
Trond Egil Soltvedt – Coventry City, Southampton – 1997–2001
Ragnvald Soma – West Ham United – 2000–02
Alexander Sørloth – Crystal Palace – 2017–19
Ståle Stensaas – Nottingham Forest – 1998–99
Frank Strandli – Leeds United – 1992–94
Jo Tessem – Southampton – 1999–2004
Alexander Tettey – Norwich City – 2012–14, 2015–16, 2019–20
Erik Thorstvedt – Tottenham Hotspur – 1992–95
Fredrik Ulvestad – Burnley – 2014–15

Poland 
Jan Bednarek – Southampton, Aston Villa – 2017–
Artur Boruc – Southampton, Bournemouth – 2012–14, 2015–17, 2018–19
Matty Cash – Aston Villa – 2020–
Jerzy Dudek – Liverpool – 2001–07
Łukasz Fabiański – Arsenal, Swansea City, West Ham United – 2007–11, 2012–
Jarosław Fojut – Bolton Wanderers – 2005–06
Kamil Grosicki – Hull City, West Bromwich Albion – 2016–17, 2020–21
Jakub Kiwior – Arsenal – 2022–
Mateusz Klich – Leeds United – 2020–23
Zbigniew Kruszyński – Coventry City – 1993–94
Grzegorz Krychowiak – West Bromwich Albion – 2017–18
Dariusz Kubicki – Aston Villa, Sunderland – 1993–94, 1996–97
Tomasz Kuszczak – West Bromwich Albion, Manchester United – 2004–11
Jakub Moder – Brighton & Hove Albion – 2020–
Emmanuel Olisadebe – Portsmouth – 2005–06
Przemysław Płacheta – Norwich City – 2021–22
Grzegorz Rasiak – Tottenham Hotspur, Bolton Wanderers – 2005–06, 2007–08
Ebi Smolarek – Bolton Wanderers – 2008–09
Piotr Świerczewski – Birmingham City – 2002–03
Wojciech Szczęsny – Arsenal – 2010–15
Robert Warzycha – Everton – 1992–94
Marcin Wasilewski – Leicester City – 2014–17

Portugal 

Marco Almeida – Southampton – 1999–2000
Paulo Alves – West Ham United – 1997–98
Bruno Andrade – Queens Park Rangers – 2011–12
Amaury Bischoff – Arsenal – 2008–09
Luís Boa Morte – Arsenal, Southampton, Fulham, West Ham United – 1997–2000, 2001–11
José Bosingwa – Chelsea, Queens Park Rangers – 2008–13
Jorge Cadete – Bradford City – 1999–2000
Cafú – Nottingham Forest – 2022–
Rafael Camacho – Liverpool – 2018–19
João Cancelo – Manchester City – 2019–23
Daniel Carriço – Reading – 2012–13
Fábio Carvalho – Liverpool – 2022–
Ricardo Carvalho – Chelsea – 2004–10
Ivan Cavaleiro – Wolverhampton Wanderers, Fulham – 2018–19, 2020–21
Cédric – Southampton, Arsenal, Fulham – 2015–
Chiquinho – Wolverhampton Wanderers – 2021–
Jorge Costa – Charlton Athletic – 2001–02
Diogo Dalot – Manchester United – 2018–20, 2021–
Dani – West Ham United – 1995–96
Deco – Chelsea – 2008–10
Rúben Dias – Manchester City – 2020–
José Dominguez – Tottenham Hotspur – 1997–2001
Eder – Swansea City – 2015–16
João Félix – Chelsea – 2022–
Bruno Fernandes – Manchester United – 2019–
Gedson Fernandes – Tottenham Hotspur – 2019–20
Manuel Fernandes – Portsmouth, Everton – 2006–08
Paulo Ferreira – Chelsea – 2004–13
José Fonte – Southampton, West Ham United – 2012–18
Paulo Futre – West Ham United – 1996–97
André Gomes – Everton – 2018–22
Gonçalo Guedes – Wolverhampton Wanderers – 2022–23
Hélder – Newcastle United – 1999–2000
Henrique Hilário – Chelsea – 2006–10, 2011–12
João Mário – West Ham United – 2017–18
Jordão – West Bromwich Albion – 2002–03
Bruno Jordão – Wolverhampton Wanderers – 2019–20
Diogo Jota – Wolverhampton Wanderers, Liverpool – 2018–
Ariza Makukula – Bolton Wanderers – 2008–09
Maniche – Chelsea – 2005–06
Raul Meireles – Liverpool, Chelsea – 2010–12
Pedro Mendes – Tottenham Hotspur, Portsmouth – 2004–08
Nuno Morais – Chelsea – 2004–05, 2006–07
João Moutinho – Wolverhampton Wanderers – 2018–
Nani – Manchester United – 2007–15
Fernando Nélson – Aston Villa – 1996–98
Pedro Neto – Wolverhampton Wanderers – 2019–
Rúben Neves – Wolverhampton Wanderers – 2018–
Matheus Nunes – Wolverhampton Wanderers – 2022–
Filipe Oliveira – Chelsea – 2002–05
Nélson Oliveira – Swansea City – 2014–15
João Palhinha – Fulham – 2022–
Rui Patrício – Wolverhampton Wanderers – 2018–21
Joel Pereira – Manchester United – 2016–17
Ricardo Pereira – Leicester City – 2018–
Ivo Pinto – Norwich City – 2015–16
Daniel Podence – Wolverhampton Wanderers – 2019–
Hugo Porfírio – West Ham United, Nottingham Forest – 1996–97, 1998–99
Hélder Postiga – Tottenham Hotspur – 2003–04
Ricardo Quaresma – Chelsea – 2008–09
Domingos Quina – Watford – 2018–20
Bruno Ribeiro – Leeds United – 1997–99
Ricardo Rocha – Tottenham Hotspur, Portsmouth – 2006–08, 2009–10
Dani Rodrigues – Southampton – 1999–2000
Cristiano Ronaldo – Manchester United – 2003–09, 2021–23
José Sá – Wolverhampton Wanderers – 2021–
Orlando Sá – Fulham – 2011–12
Renato Sanches – Swansea City – 2017–18
Nélson Semedo – Wolverhampton Wanderers – 2020–
Silas – Wolverhampton Wanderers – 2003–04
Adrien Silva – Leicester City – 2017–19
Bernardo Silva – Manchester City – 2017–
Fábio Silva – Wolverhampton Wanderers – 2020–22
Xande Silva – West Ham United – 2018–19
Nuno Tavares – Arsenal – 2021–22
Sidnei Tavares – Leicester City – 2020–21
Filipe Teixeira – West Bromwich Albion – 2008–09
João Carlos Teixeira – Liverpool – 2013–14, 2015–16
Tiago – Chelsea – 2004–05
Toti – Wolverhampton Wanderers – 2021–
Francisco Trincão – Wolverhampton Wanderers – 2021–22
Nuno Valente – Everton – 2005–09
Silvestre Varela – West Bromwich Albion – 2014–15
Ricardo Vaz Tê – Bolton Wanderers, West Ham United – 2003–09, 2012–15
Hugo Viana – Newcastle United – 2002–04
Fábio Vieira – Arsenal – 2022–
Rúben Vinagre – Wolverhampton Wanderers, Everton – 2018–21, 2022–
João Virgínia – Everton – 2020–21
Vitinha – Wolverhampton Wanderers – 2020–21
Abel Xavier – Everton, Liverpool, Middlesbrough – 1999–2003, 2005–07

Republic of Ireland 

Keith Andrews – Wolverhampton Wanderers, Blackburn Rovers, West Bromwich Albion – 2003–04, 2008–12
Harry Arter – Bournemouth, Cardiff City – 2015–19
Phil Babb – Coventry City, Liverpool, Sunderland – 1992–99, 2002–03
Graham Barrett – Arsenal – 1999–2000
Gavin Bazunu – Southampton – 2022–
Leon Best – Southampton, Newcastle United – 2004–05, 2010–12
Willie Boland – Coventry City – 1992–98
Danny Boxall – Crystal Palace – 1997–98
Lee Boylan – West Ham United – 1996–97
Robbie Brady – Hull City, Norwich City, Burnley – 2013–21
Keith Branagan – Bolton Wanderers, Ipswich Town – 1995–96, 1997–98, 2000–02
Gary Breen – Coventry City, West Ham United, Sunderland – 1996–2001, 2002–03, 2005–06
Paul Butler – Sunderland, Wolverhampton Wanderers – 1999–2001, 2003–04
Thomas Butler – Sunderland – 1999–2003
Shaun Byrne – West Ham United – 1999–2000, 2001–02
Thomas Cannon – Everton – 2022–23
Brian Carey – Leicester City – 1994–95
Stephen Carr – Tottenham Hotspur, Newcastle United, Birmingham City – 1993–94, 1996–2001, 2002–08, 2009–11
Samir Carruthers – Aston Villa – 2011–12
Lee Carsley – Derby County, Blackburn Rovers, Coventry City, Everton, Birmingham City – 1996–99, 2000–08, 2009–10
Tony Cascarino – Chelsea – 1992–94
Cyrus Christie – Fulham – 2018–19
Ciaran Clark – Aston Villa, Newcastle United – 2009–16, 2017–22
Clive Clarke – West Ham United – 2005–06
Séamus Coleman – Everton – 2009–
Nick Colgan – Chelsea – 1996–97
Nathan Collins – Burnley, Wolverhampton Wanderers – 2021–
Aaron Connolly – Brighton & Hove Albion – 2019–22
David Connolly – Wigan Athletic, Sunderland – 2005–08
Conor Coventry – West Ham United – 2022–
Simon Cox – West Bromwich Albion – 2010–12
Owen Coyle – Bolton Wanderers – 1995–96
Jim Crawford – Newcastle United – 1996–97
Josh Cullen – West Ham United – 2015–16, 2017–18
Micky Cummins – Middlesbrough – 1998–2000
Greg Cunningham – Manchester City, Cardiff City – 2009–10, 2018–19
Kenny Cunningham – Wimbledon, Birmingham City – 1994–2000, 2002–06
Liam Daish – Coventry City – 1995–97
Damien Delaney – Leicester City, Crystal Palace – 2000–02, 2013–18
Rory Delap – Derby County, Southampton, Sunderland, Stoke City – 1997–2006, 2008–13
Gary Doherty – Tottenham Hotspur, Norwich City – 1999–2005
Matt Doherty – Wolverhampton Wanderers, Tottenham Hotspur – 2011–12, 2018–23
Aaron Doran – Blackburn Rovers – 2008–09
Jonathan Douglas – Blackburn Rovers – 2002–05
Colin Doyle – Birmingham City – 2007–08, 2010–11
Kevin Doyle – Reading, Wolverhampton Wanderers, Crystal Palace – 2006–08, 2009–12, 2014–15
Damien Duff – Blackburn Rovers, Chelsea, Newcastle United, Fulham – 1996–99, 2001–14
Shane Duffy – Everton, Brighton & Hove Albion, Fulham – 2011–13, 2017–20, 2021–
Jimmy Dunne – Burnley – 2020–21
Richard Dunne – Everton, Manchester City, Aston Villa, Queens Park Rangers – 1996–2001, 2002–12, 2014–15
John Egan – Sheffield United – 2019–21
Rob Elliot – Newcastle United – 2012–16, 2017–18
Stephen Elliott – Manchester City, Sunderland – 2003–04, 2005–06
Mickey Evans – Southampton – 1996–98
Keith Fahey – Birmingham City – 2009–11
Gareth Farrelly – Aston Villa, Everton, Bolton Wanderers – 1995–99, 2001–03
Neale Fenn – Tottenham Hotspur – 1996–98
Evan Ferguson – Brighton & Hove Albion – 2021–
Steve Finnan – Fulham, Liverpool, Portsmouth – 2001–08, 2009–10
Scott Fitzgerald – Wimbledon – 1992–96
Curtis Fleming – Middlesbrough – 1992–93, 1995–97, 1998–2002
Willo Flood – Manchester City – 2004–06
Caleb Folan – Wigan Athletic, Hull City – 2006–10
Tony Folan – Crystal Palace – 1997–98
Dominic Foley – Watford – 1999–2000
Kevin Foley – Wolverhampton Wanderers – 2009–12
Anthony Forde – Wolverhampton Wanderers – 2011–12
Owen Garvan – Crystal Palace – 2013–14
Jason Gavin – Middlesbrough – 1998–2002
Derek Geary – Sheffield United – 2006–07
Darron Gibson – Manchester United, Everton, Sunderland – 2008–17
Rory Ginty – Crystal Palace – 1997–98
Shay Given – Blackburn Rovers, Newcastle United, Manchester City, Aston Villa, Stoke City – 1996–2010, 2011–13, 2014–17
Jon Goodman – Wimbledon – 1994–97
Reece Grego-Cox – Queens Park Rangers – 2014–15
Michael Harriman – Queens Park Rangers – 2011–13
Ian Harte – Leeds United, Sunderland, Reading – 1995–2004, 2007–08, 2012–13
Jeff Hendrick – Burnley, Newcastle United – 2016–22
Joe Hodge – Wolverhampton Wanderers – 2022–
Matt Holland – Ipswich Town, Charlton Athletic – 2000–02, 2003–07
Wes Hoolahan – Norwich City – 2011–14, 2015–16
Ray Houghton – Aston Villa, Crystal Palace – 1992–95
Conor Hourihane – Aston Villa – 2019–21
Noel Hunt – Reading – 2012–13
Stephen Hunt – Reading, Hull City, Wolverhampton Wanderers – 2006–08, 2009–12
Adam Idah – Norwich City – 2019–20, 2021–22
Stephen Ireland – Manchester City, Aston Villa, Newcastle United, Stoke City – 2005–16, 2017–18
Denis Irwin – Manchester United, Wolverhampton Wanderers – 1992–2002, 2003–04
Graham Kavanagh – Middlesbrough, Wigan Athletic – 1992–93, 1995–96, 2005–07
Robbie Keane – Coventry City, Leeds United, Tottenham Hotspur, Liverpool, West Ham United, Aston Villa – 1999–2012
Roy Keane – Nottingham Forest, Manchester United – 1992–2006
Will Keane – Manchester United, Hull City – 2011–12, 2015–17
Caoimhín Kelleher – Liverpool – 2020–
Alan Kelly – Sheffield United, Blackburn Rovers – 1992–94, 2001–03
David Kelly – Sunderland – 1996–97
Gary Kelly – Leeds United – 1993–98, 1999–2004
Stephen Kelly – Tottenham Hotspur, Birmingham City, Stoke City, Fulham, Reading – 2003–06, 2007–13
Jeff Kenna – Southampton, Blackburn Rovers, Birmingham City – 1992–99, 2002–04
Mark Kennedy – Liverpool, Wimbledon, Manchester City, Wolverhampton Wanderers – 1994–99, 2000–01, 2003–04
Paddy Kenny – Sheffield United, Queens Park Rangers – 2006–07, 2011–12
Andy Keogh – Wolverhampton Wanderers – 2009–11
Alan Kernaghan – Middlesbrough, Manchester City – 1992–96
Dean Kiely – Charlton Athletic, Portsmouth, West Bromwich Albion – 2000–06, 2008–09
Kevin Kilbane – Sunderland, Everton, Wigan Athletic, Hull City – 1999–2010
Mark Kinsella – Charlton Athletic, Aston Villa – 1998–99, 2000–04
Brian Launders – Crystal Palace, Derby County – 1994–95, 1998–99
Liam Lawrence – Sunderland, Stoke City – 2005–06, 2008–10
Kevin Long – Burnley – 2014–15, 2016–22
Shane Long – Reading, West Bromwich Albion, Hull City, Southampton – 2006–08, 2011–21
Jon Macken – Manchester City, Derby County – 2002–05, 2007–08
Alan Mahon – Blackburn Rovers, Wigan Athletic – 2001–04, 2005–06
Alan Maybury – Leeds United – 1995–96, 1997–98, 2001–02
Jason McAteer – Bolton Wanderers, Liverpool, Blackburn Rovers, Sunderland – 1995–99, 2001–03
Chris McCann – Burnley – 2009–10
James McCarthy – Wigan Athletic, Everton, Crystal Palace – 2009–21
Paddy McCarthy – Crystal Palace – 2013–14
James McClean – Sunderland, West Bromwich Albion – 2011–13, 2015–18
David McDonald – Tottenham Hotspur – 1992–93
Aiden McGeady – Everton – 2013–15
Paul McGee – Wimbledon – 1992–93
David McGoldrick – Sheffield United – 2019–21
Eddie McGoldrick – Crystal Palace, Arsenal – 1992–97
Brian McGovern – Arsenal – 1999–2000
Paul McGrath – Aston Villa, Derby County – 1992–97
John McGrath – Aston Villa – 2000–01
Mark McKeever – Sheffield Wednesday – 1998–2000
Stephen McPhail – Leeds United – 1997–2004
Paul McShane – Sunderland, Hull City – 2007–10, 2013–15
David Meyler – Sunderland, Hull City – 2009–15, 2016–17
Liam Miller – Manchester United, Sunderland – 2004–06, 2007–09
Mike Milligan – Oldham Athletic, Norwich City – 1992–95
Adam Mitchell – Sunderland – 2012–13
Jayson Molumby – Brighton & Hove Albion – 2020–21
Alan Moore – Middlesbrough – 1992–93, 1995–97, 1998–99
Andrew Moran – Brighton & Hove Albion – 2022–
Kevin Moran – Blackburn Rovers – 1992–94
Chris Morris – Middlesbrough – 1992–93, 1995–97
Clinton Morrison – Crystal Palace, Birmingham City – 1997–98, 2002–06
Daryl Murphy – Sunderland – 2005–06, 2007–10
Joe Murphy – West Bromwich Albion – 2002–03
Michael Obafemi – Southampton – 2017–21
Alan O'Brien – Newcastle United – 2005–07
Andy O'Brien – Bradford City, Newcastle United, Portsmouth, Bolton Wanderers – 1999–2011
Joey O'Brien – Bolton Wanderers, West Ham United – 2004–06, 2007–09, 2012–15
Liam O'Brien – Newcastle United – 1993–94
Roy O'Donovan – Sunderland – 2007–08
Keith O'Halloran – Middlesbrough – 1995–96
Eunan O'Kane – Bournemouth – 2015–16
David O'Leary – Arsenal, Leeds United – 1992–94
Andrew Omobamidele – Norwich City – 2021–22
Keith O'Neill – Norwich City, Middlesbrough – 1994–95, 1998–2001
Dara O'Shea – West Bromwich Albion – 2020–21
Jay O'Shea – Birmingham City – 2009–10
John O'Shea – Manchester United, Sunderland – 2001–17
Marcos Painter – Birmingham City – 2005–06
Troy Parrott – Tottenham Hotspur – 2019–20
Alex Pearce – Reading – 2012–13
Gerry Peyton – Chelsea – 1992–93
Terry Phelan – Manchester City, Chelsea, Everton – 1992–98, 1999–2000
Anthony Pilkington – Norwich City – 2011–14
Darren Potter – Liverpool – 2004–05
Lee Power – Norwich City – 1992–94
Alan Quinn – Sheffield Wednesday, Sheffield United – 1997–2000, 2006–07
Barry Quinn – Coventry City – 1998–2001
Niall Quinn – Manchester City, Sunderland – 1992–97, 1999–2003
Rob Quinn – Crystal Palace – 1997–98
Stephen Quinn – Sheffield United, Hull City – 2006–07, 2013–15
Darren Randolph – Charlton Athletic, West Ham United – 2006–07, 2015–17, 2019–21
Michael Reddy – Sunderland – 1999–2001
Andy Reid – Tottenham Hotspur, Charlton Athletic, Sunderland, Blackpool – 2004–11
Steven Reid – Blackburn Rovers, West Bromwich Albion, Burnley – 2003–15
Callum Robinson – Aston Villa, Sheffield United, West Bromwich Albion – 2013–14, 2019–21
Matthew Rush – West Ham United – 1993–95
Richie Ryan – Sunderland – 2002–03
Conor Sammon – Wigan Athletic – 2010–12
John Sheridan – Sheffield Wednesday, Bolton Wanderers – 1992–98
Tony Sheridan – Coventry City – 1992–94
Bernie Slaven – Middlesbrough – 1992–93
Will Smallbone – Southampton – 2019–22
Tony Springett – Norwich City – 2021–22
Steve Staunton – Aston Villa, Liverpool – 1992–2003
Enda Stevens – Aston Villa, Sheffield United – 2012–13, 2019–21
Anthony Stokes – Sunderland – 2007–09
Jay Tabb – Reading – 2012–13
Sean Thornton – Sunderland – 2002–03
Kevin Toner – Aston Villa – 2015–16
Andy Townsend – Chelsea, Aston Villa, Middlesbrough – 1992–2000
Mark Travers – Bournemouth – 2018–20, 2022–
Keith Treacy – Blackburn Rovers – 2008–09
Andy Turner – Tottenham Hotspur – 1992–95
Jonathan Walters – Bolton Wanderers, Stoke City, Burnley – 2002–03, 2010–18
Stephen Ward – Wolverhampton Wanderers, Burnley – 2009–12, 2014–15, 2016–19
Keiren Westwood – Sunderland – 2011–12, 2013–14
Gareth Whalley – Bradford City – 1999–2001
Glenn Whelan – Stoke City – 2008–17
Ronnie Whelan – Liverpool – 1992–94
Derrick Williams – Aston Villa – 2012–13
Marc Wilson – Portsmouth, Stoke City, West Bromwich Albion – 2008–17
Mark Yeates – Tottenham Hotspur – 2003–05

Romania 

Florin Andone – Brighton & Hove Albion – 2018–20
Vlad Chiricheș – Tottenham Hotspur – 2013–15
Cosmin Contra – West Bromwich Albion – 2004–05
Ilie Dumitrescu – Tottenham Hotspur, West Ham United – 1994–97
Ionel Ganea – Wolverhampton Wanderers – 2003–04
Florin Gardoș – Southampton – 2014–15
Viorel Moldovan – Coventry City – 1997–98
Adrian Mutu – Chelsea – 2003–05
Costel Pantilimon – Manchester City, Sunderland, Watford – 2013–17
Dan Petrescu – Sheffield Wednesday, Chelsea, Bradford City, Southampton – 1994–2002
Gheorghe Popescu – Tottenham Hotspur – 1994–95
Florin Răducioiu – West Ham United – 1996–97
Răzvan Raț – West Ham United – 2013–14
Gabriel Tamaș – West Bromwich Albion – 2010–13

Russia 

Andrey Arshavin – Arsenal – 2008–13
Diniyar Bilyaletdinov – Everton – 2009–12
Andrei Kanchelskis – Manchester United, Everton, Manchester City, Southampton – 1992–97, 2000–01, 2002–03
Dmitri Kharine – Chelsea – 1992–99
Roman Pavlyuchenko – Tottenham Hotspur – 2008–12
Pavel Pogrebnyak – Fulham, Reading – 2011–13
Alexey Smertin – Portsmouth, Chelsea, Charlton Athletic, Fulham – 2003–08
Yuri Zhirkov – Chelsea – 2009–11

Serbia 

Jovo Bosančić – Barnsley – 1997–98
Goran Bunjevčević – Tottenham Hotspur – 2001–05
Saša Ćurčić – Bolton Wanderers, Aston Villa, Crystal Palace – 1995–98
Filip Đuričić – Southampton – 2014–15
Marko Grujić – Liverpool – 2016–18
Saša Ilić – Charlton Athletic, West Ham United – 1998–2001
Branislav Ivanović – Chelsea, West Bromwich Albion – 2008–17, 2020–21
Slaviša Jokanović – Chelsea – 2000–02
Milan Jovanović – Liverpool – 2010–11
Mateja Kežman – Chelsea – 2004–05
Aleksandar Kolarov – Manchester City – 2010–17
Ognjen Koroman – Portsmouth – 2005–07
Darko Kovačević – Sheffield Wednesday – 1995–96
Saša Lukić – Fulham – 2022–
Lazar Marković – Liverpool, Hull City, Fulham – 2014–15, 2016–17, 2018–19
Nemanja Matić – Chelsea, Manchester United – 2009–10, 2013–22
Nenad Milijaš – Wolverhampton Wanderers – 2009–12
Luka Milivojević – Crystal Palace – 2016–
Savo Milošević – Aston Villa – 1995–98
Aleksandar Mitrović – Newcastle United, Fulham – 2015–16, 2017–19, 2020–21, 2022–
Matija Nastasić – Manchester City – 2012–14
Radosav Petrović – Blackburn Rovers – 2011–12
Dejan Stefanović – Sheffield Wednesday, Portsmouth, Fulham – 1995–99, 2003–08
Vladimir Stojković – Wigan Athletic – 2009–10
Dušan Tadić – Southampton – 2014–18
Zoran Tošić – Manchester United – 2008–09
Miloš Veljković – Tottenham Hotspur – 2013–14
Nemanja Vidić – Manchester United – 2005–14
Zvonimir Vukić – Portsmouth – 2005–06
Nikola Žigić – Birmingham City – 2010–11

Slovakia 
Igor Bališ – West Bromwich Albion – 2002–03
Marek Čech – West Bromwich Albion – 2008–09, 2010–11
Martin Dúbravka – Newcastle United – 2017–
Ondrej Duda – Norwich City – 2019–20
Vratislav Greško – Blackburn Rovers – 2002–06
Vladimír Kinder – Middlesbrough – 1996–97, 1998–99
Ján Kozák – West Bromwich Albion – 2005–06
Juraj Kucka – Watford – 2021–22
Vladimír Labant – West Ham United – 2001–03
Filip Lesniak – Tottenham Hotspur – 2016–17
Ľubomír Michalík – Bolton Wanderers – 2006–08
Ján Mucha – Everton – 2012–13
Szilárd Németh – Middlesbrough – 2001–06
Marek Rodák – Fulham – 2020–21, 2022–
Martin Škrtel – Liverpool – 2007–16
Miroslav Stoch – Chelsea – 2008–09
Dionatan Teixeira – Stoke City – 2014–16
Stanislav Varga – Sunderland – 2000–02
Vladimír Weiss – Manchester City, Bolton Wanderers – 2008–10

Slovenia 
Milenko Ačimovič – Tottenham Hotspur – 2002–03
Jon Gorenc Stanković – Huddersfield Town – 2018–19
Robert Koren – West Bromwich Albion, Hull City – 2008–09, 2013–14
Aleš Križan – Barnsley – 1997–98
Aleksander Rodić – Portsmouth – 2004–05
Haris Vučkić – Newcastle United – 2011–12, 2014–15

Spain 

Adama Traoré – Aston Villa, Middlesbrough, Wolverhampton Wanderers – 2015–17, 2018–
Adrián – West Ham United, Liverpool – 2013–18, 2019–21
Thiago Alcântara – Liverpool – 2020–
Manuel Almunia – Arsenal – 2004–05, 2006–11
Marcos Alonso – Bolton Wanderers, Sunderland, Chelsea – 2010–12, 2013–14, 2016–22
Mikel Alonso – Bolton Wanderers – 2007–08
Xabi Alonso – Liverpool – 2004–09
Angeliño – Manchester City – 2019–20
Álvaro Arbeloa – Liverpool, West Ham United – 2006–09, 2016–17
Mikel Arteta – Everton, Arsenal – 2004–16
Iago Aspas – Liverpool – 2013–14
Daniel Ayala – Liverpool, Norwich City, Middlesbrough – 2009–10, 2011–12, 2016–17
César Azpilicueta – Chelsea – 2012–
Stefan Bajcetic – Liverpool – 2022–
Antonio Barragán – Middlesbrough – 2016–17
Héctor Bellerín – Arsenal – 2014–21
Bojan – Stoke City – 2014–18
Borja Bastón – Swansea City, Aston Villa – 2016–17, 2019–20
Raúl Bravo – Leeds United – 2002–03
Bruno – Brighton & Hove Albion – 2017–19
Hugo Bueno – Wolverhampton Wanderers – 2022–
Cala – Cardiff City – 2013–14
Víctor Camarasa – Cardiff City, Crystal Palace – 2018–20
Eduard Campabadal – Wigan Athletic – 2012–13
José Campaña – Crystal Palace – 2013–14
Iván Campo – Bolton Wanderers – 2002–08
José Cañas – Swansea City – 2013–14
Sergi Canós – Liverpool, Brentford – 2015–16, 2021–
Kiko Casilla – Leeds United – 2020–21
Santi Cazorla – Arsenal – 2012–17
Dani Ceballos – Arsenal – 2019–21
César – Bolton Wanderers – 2006–07
Pedro Chirivella – Liverpool – 2015–16
Diego Costa – Chelsea, Wolverhampton Wanderers – 2014–17, 2022–
Pablo Couñago – Ipswich Town – 2001–02
José Ángel Crespo – Aston Villa – 2015–16
Albert Crusat – Wigan Athletic – 2011–12
Marc Cucurella – Brighton & Hove Albion, Chelsea – 2021–
Carlos Cuéllar – Aston Villa, Sunderland – 2008–14
Gerard Deulofeu – Everton, Watford – 2013–14, 2015–20
David de Gea – Manchester United – 2011–
Enrique de Lucas – Chelsea – 2002–03
Javier de Pedro – Blackburn Rovers – 2004–05
Asier del Horno – Chelsea – 2005–06
Brahim Díaz – Manchester City – 2017–18
José Enrique – Newcastle United, Liverpool – 2007–15
Cesc Fàbregas – Arsenal, Chelsea – 2004–11, 2014–19
Fabri – Fulham – 2018–19
Iago Falque – Tottenham Hotspur – 2012–13
Kiko Femenía – Watford – 2017–20, 2021–22
Álvaro Fernández – Brentford – 2021–22
Albert Ferrer – Chelsea – 1998–2003
Junior Firpo – Leeds United – 2021–
Chico Flores – Swansea City – 2012–14
Pablo Fornals – West Ham United – 2019–
Jesús Gámez – Newcastle United – 2017–18
Aleix García – Manchester City – 2016–17
Eric García – Manchester City – 2019–21
Javi García – Manchester City – 2012–14
Luis García – Liverpool – 2004–07
Manu García – Manchester City – 2015–16
Javier Garrido – Manchester City, Norwich City – 2007–10, 2012–14
Bryan Gil – Tottenham Hotspur – 2021–23
Carles Gil – Aston Villa – 2014–16
Román Golobart – Wigan Athletic – 2012–13
Jordi Gómez – Wigan Athletic, Sunderland – 2009–13, 2014–16
Sergio Gómez – Manchester City – 2022–
Esteban Granero – Queens Park Rangers – 2012–13
Vicente Guaita – Crystal Palace – 2018–
Luis Hernández – Leicester City – 2016–17
Pablo Hernández – Swansea City, Leeds United – 2012–14, 2020–21
Ander Herrera – Manchester United – 2014–19
Fernando Hierro – Bolton Wanderers – 2004–05
Pablo Ibáñez – West Bromwich Albion – 2010–11
Vicente Iborra – Leicester City – 2017–19
Jesé – Stoke City – 2017–18
Joel – Wigan Athletic, Everton – 2012–17
Jonny – Wolverhampton Wanderers – 2018–
Joselu – Stoke City, Newcastle United – 2015–16, 2017–19
Josemi – Liverpool – 2004–06
Mateo Joseph – Leeds United – 2022–
Jota – Aston Villa – 2019–20
Juanmi – Southampton – 2015–16
José Manuel Jurado – Watford – 2015–16
Kepa Arrizabalaga – Chelsea – 2018–
Kepa Blanco – West Ham United – 2006–07
Aymeric Laporte – Manchester City – 2017–
Juan Larios – Southampton – 2022–
Diego Llorente – Leeds United – 2020–23
Fernando Llorente – Swansea City, Tottenham Hotspur – 2016–19
Adrián López – Wigan Athletic – 2010–13
Lucas Pérez – Arsenal, West Ham United – 2016–17, 2018–19
Luis Alberto – Liverpool – 2013–14
Antonio Luna – Aston Villa – 2013–14
Albert Luque – Newcastle United – 2005–07
Javier Manquillo – Liverpool, Sunderland, Newcastle United – 2014–15, 2016–
Marcelino – Newcastle United – 1999–2001
Pablo Marí – Arsenal – 2019–22
Juan Mata – Chelsea, Manchester United – 2011–22
Gaizka Mendieta – Middlesbrough – 2003–07
Fran Mérida – Arsenal – 2008–10
Mikel Merino – Newcastle United – 2017–18
Roque Mesa – Swansea City – 2017–18
Míchel – Birmingham City – 2009–10
Michu – Swansea City – 2012–14
Ignasi Miquel – Arsenal – 2011–13
Nacho Monreal – Arsenal – 2012–20
Martín Montoya – Brighton & Hove Albion – 2018–20
Álvaro Morata – Chelsea – 2017–19
Alberto Moreno – Liverpool – 2014–19
Álex Moreno – Aston Villa – 2022–
Javi Moreno – Bolton Wanderers – 2003–04
Fernando Morientes – Liverpool – 2004–06
Marc Muniesa – Stoke City – 2013–17
Marc Navarro – Watford – 2018–19
Jesús Navas – Manchester City – 2013–17
Nayim – Tottenham Hotspur – 1992–93
Álvaro Negredo – Manchester City, Middlesbrough – 2013–14, 2016–17
Saúl Ñíguez – Chelsea – 2021–22
Nolito – Manchester City – 2016–17
Antonio Núñez – Liverpool – 2004–05
Andrea Orlandi – Swansea City – 2011–12
Borja Oubiña – Birmingham City – 2007–08
David Ozoh – Crystal Palace – 2022–
Daniel Pacheco – Liverpool – 2009–11
Pedro – Chelsea – 2015–20
Ayoze Pérez – Newcastle United, Leicester City – 2014–16, 2017–23
Gerard Piqué – Manchester United – 2005–06, 2007–08
Pedro Porro – Tottenham Hotspur – 2022–
José Ángel Pozo – Manchester City – 2014–15
Alejandro Pozuelo – Swansea City – 2013–14
Iván Ramis – Wigan Athletic – 2012–13
Àngel Rangel – Swansea City – 2011–18
David Raya – Brentford – 2021–
Sergio Reguilón – Tottenham Hotspur – 2020–22
Pepe Reina – Liverpool, Aston Villa – 2005–13, 2019–20
José Antonio Reyes – Arsenal – 2003–06
Ricardo – Manchester United – 2002–03
Diego Rico – Bournemouth – 2018–20
Sergio Rico – Fulham – 2018–19
Albert Riera – Manchester City, Liverpool – 2005–06, 2008–10
Roberto – West Ham United – 2019–20
Marc Roca – Leeds United – 2022–
Rubén Rochina – Blackburn Rovers – 2010–12
Rodri – Manchester City – 2019–
Rodrigo – Bolton Wanderers, Leeds United – 2010–11, 2020–
Oriol Romeu – Chelsea, Southampton – 2011–13, 2015–23
Míchel Salgado – Blackburn Rovers – 2009–12
Salva – Bolton Wanderers – 2002–03
Robert Sánchez – Brighton & Hove Albion – 2020–
Sandro – Everton – 2017–18
Pablo Sarabia – Wolverhampton Wanderers – 2022–
David Silva – Manchester City – 2010–20
Roberto Soldado – Tottenham Hotspur – 2013–15
Denis Suárez – Arsenal – 2018–19
Mario Suárez – Watford – 2015–16
Suso – Liverpool – 2012–13
Fernando Torres – Liverpool, Chelsea – 2007–14
Ferran Torres – Manchester City – 2020–22
Diego Tristán – West Ham United – 2008–09
Víctor Valdés – Manchester United, Middlesbrough – 2014–15, 2016–17
Borja Valero – West Bromwich Albion – 2008–09
Jesús Vallejo – Wolverhampton Wanderers – 2019–20
Álvaro Vázquez – Swansea City – 2013–14
Xisco – Newcastle United – 2008–09, 2010–11
Yordi – Blackburn Rovers – 2001–02

Sweden 
Niclas Alexandersson – Sheffield Wednesday, Everton – 1997–2003
Marcus Allbäck – Aston Villa – 2002–04
Anders Andersson – Blackburn Rovers – 1997–98
Andreas Andersson – Newcastle United – 1997–99
Patrik Andersson – Blackburn Rovers – 1992–94
Joel Asoro – Sunderland – 2016–17
Ludwig Augustinsson – Aston Villa – 2022–23
Joachim Björklund – Sunderland – 2001–03
Jesper Blomqvist – Manchester United, Everton, Charlton Athletic – 1998–99, 2001–03
Tomas Brolin – Leeds United, Crystal Palace – 1995–96, 1997–98
Martin Dahlin – Blackburn Rovers – 1997–99
Bojan Djordjic – Manchester United – 2000–01
Erik Edman – Tottenham Hotspur, Wigan Athletic – 2004–06, 2007–10
Anthony Elanga – Manchester United – 2020–
David Elm – Fulham – 2009–10
Johan Elmander – Bolton Wanderers, Norwich City – 2008–11, 2013–14
Jan Eriksson – Sunderland – 1996–97
Andreas Granqvist – Wigan Athletic – 2007–08
Niklas Gudmundsson – Blackburn Rovers – 1995–97
John Guidetti – Stoke City – 2013–14
Tomas Gustafsson – Coventry City – 1999–2000
Magnus Hedman – Coventry City – 1997–2001
Zlatan Ibrahimović – Manchester United – 2016–18
Klas Ingesson – Sheffield Wednesday – 1994–96
Alexander Isak – Newcastle United – 2022–
Andreas Isaksson – Manchester City – 2006–08
Andreas Jakobsson – Southampton – 2004–05
Pontus Jansson – Brentford – 2021–
Andreas Johansson – Wigan Athletic – 2005–07
Nils-Eric Johansson – Blackburn Rovers – 2001–05
Mattias Jonson – Norwich City – 2004–05
Alexander Kačaniklić – Fulham – 2011–14
Kim Källström – Arsenal – 2013–14
Pontus Kåmark – Leicester City – 1996–99
Emil Krafth – Newcastle United – 2019–
Dejan Kulusevski – Tottenham Hotspur – 2021–
Henrik Larsson – Manchester United – 2006–07
Sebastian Larsson – Arsenal, Birmingham City, Sunderland – 2005–06, 2007–08, 2009–17
Anders Limpar – Arsenal, Everton – 1992–97
Victor Lindelöf – Manchester United – 2017–
Tobias Linderoth – Everton – 2001–04
Freddie Ljungberg – Arsenal, West Ham United – 1998–2008
Teddy Lučić – Leeds United – 2002–03
Peter Markstedt – Barnsley – 1997–98
Jesper Mattsson – Nottingham Forest – 1998–99
Olof Mellberg – Aston Villa – 2001–08
Joel Mumbongo – Burnley – 2020–21
Mikael Nilsson – Southampton – 2004–05
Roland Nilsson – Sheffield Wednesday, Coventry City – 1992–94, 1997–99
Kristoffer Nordfeldt – Swansea City – 2015–17
Robin Olsen – Everton, Aston Villa – 2020–
Jonas Olsson – West Bromwich Albion – 2008–09, 2010–17
Marcus Olsson – Blackburn Rovers – 2011–12
Martin Olsson – Blackburn Rovers, Norwich City, Swansea City – 2007–12, 2013–14, 2015–18
Rade Prica – Sunderland – 2007–08
Martin Pringle – Charlton Athletic – 1998–99, 2000–01
Marino Rahmberg – Derby County – 1996–97
Markus Rosenberg – West Bromwich Albion – 2012–14
Björn Runström – Fulham – 2006–07
Stefan Schwarz – Arsenal, Sunderland – 1994–95, 1999–2002
Ken Sema – Watford – 2018–19, 2021–22
Rami Shaaban – Arsenal – 2002–03
Fredrik Stoor – Fulham – 2008–10
Anders Svensson – Southampton – 2001–05
Mathias Svensson – Charlton Athletic, Norwich City – 2000–05
Michael Svensson – Southampton – 2002–04
Muamer Tanković – Fulham – 2013–14
Ola Toivonen – Sunderland – 2015–16
Christian Wilhelmsson – Bolton Wanderers – 2007–08
Jonas Wirmola – Sheffield United – 1993–94

Switzerland 
Almen Abdi – Watford – 2015–16
Albian Ajeti – West Ham United – 2019–20
Manuel Akanji – Manchester City  – 2022–
Valon Behrami – West Ham United, Watford – 2008–11, 2015–17
Gaetano Berardi – Leeds United – 2020–21
Bruno Berner – Blackburn Rovers – 2006–08
Fabio Daprelà – West Ham United – 2009–10
Philipp Degen – Liverpool – 2009–10
Johan Djourou – Arsenal, Birmingham City – 2005–12
Josip Drmić – Norwich City – 2019–20
Edimilson Fernandes – West Ham United – 2016–18
Gelson Fernandes – Manchester City – 2007–09
Patrick Foletti – Derby County – 2001–02
Remo Freuler – Nottingham Forest  – 2022–
Gaetano Giallanza – Bolton Wanderers – 1997–98
Bernt Haas – Sunderland, West Bromwich Albion – 2001–02, 2004–05
Stéphane Henchoz – Blackburn Rovers, Liverpool, Wigan Athletic – 1997–2004, 2005–07
Marc Hottiger – Newcastle United, Everton – 1994–97
Gökhan Inler – Leicester City – 2015–16
Eldin Jakupović – Hull City, Leicester City – 2013–15, 2016–18
Alex Jankewitz – Southampton – 2020–21
Pajtim Kasami – Fulham – 2011–14
Timm Klose – Norwich City – 2015–16, 2019–20
Stephan Lichtsteiner – Arsenal – 2018–19
Giuseppe Mazzarelli – Manchester City – 1995–96
Kevin Mbabu – Newcastle United, Fulham – 2015–16, 2022–
Fabian Schär – Newcastle United  – 2018–
Philippe Senderos – Arsenal, Everton, Fulham, Aston Villa – 2004–08, 2009–15
Xherdan Shaqiri – Stoke City, Liverpool – 2015–21
Ramon Vega – Tottenham Hotspur – 1996–2001
Johann Vogel – Blackburn Rovers – 2007–09
Granit Xhaka – Arsenal – 2016–
Denis Zakaria – Chelsea  – 2022–
Andi Zeqiri – Brighton & Hove Albion – 2020–21
Reto Ziegler – Tottenham Hotspur, Wigan Athletic – 2004–07

Turkey 
Bülent Akın – Bolton Wanderers – 2002–03
Yıldıray Baştürk – Blackburn Rovers – 2009–10
Emre Belözoğlu – Newcastle United – 2005–08
Halil Dervişoğlu – Brentford – 2022–23
Kerim Frei – Fulham – 2011–13
Muzzy Izzet – Leicester City, Birmingham City – 1996–2002, 2003–06
Ozan Kabak – Liverpool, Norwich City – 2020–22
Jem Karacan – Reading – 2012–13
Colin Kazim-Richards – Sheffield United – 2006–07
Tugay Kerimoğlu – Blackburn Rovers – 2001–09
Alpay Özalan – Aston Villa – 2000–04
Nuri Şahin – Liverpool – 2012–13
Çağlar Söyüncü – Leicester City – 2018–
Hakan Şükür – Blackburn Rovers – 2002–03
Gökhan Töre – West Ham United – 2016–17
Cenk Tosun – Everton, Crystal Palace – 2017–22
Ozan Tufan – Watford – 2021–22
Tuncay – Middlesbrough, Stoke City, Bolton Wanderers – 2007–12
Cengiz Ünder – Leicester City – 2020–21
Hakan Ünsal – Blackburn Rovers – 2001–02
Okay Yokuşlu – West Bromwich Albion – 2020–21

Ukraine 
Alex Evtushok – Coventry City – 1996–97
Oleh Luzhnyi – Arsenal, Wolverhampton Wanderers – 1999–2003
Mykhailo Mudryk – Chelsea – 2022–
Vitalii Mykolenko – Everton – 2021–
Serhiy Rebrov – Tottenham Hotspur – 2000–02
Andriy Shevchenko – Chelsea – 2006–08, 2009–10
Andriy Voronin – Liverpool – 2007–08, 2009–10
Andriy Yarmolenko – West Ham United – 2018–22
Oleksandr Zinchenko – Manchester City, Arsenal – 2017–

North, Central America and Caribbean (CONCACAF)

Antigua and Barbuda 
Moses Ashikodi – Watford – 2006–07
Dexter Blackstock – Southampton – 2004–05
Mikele Leigertwood – Crystal Palace, Sheffield United, Reading – 2004–05, 2006–07, 2012–13

Barbados 
Nick Blackman – Blackburn Rovers, Reading – 2011–13
Emmerson Boyce – Crystal Palace, Wigan Athletic – 2004–05, 2006–13
Gregory Goodridge – Queens Park Rangers – 1995–96
Paul Ifill – Sheffield United – 2006–07

Bermuda 
Shaun Goater – Manchester City – 2000–01, 2002–03
Kyle Lightbourne – Coventry City – 1997–98
Nahki Wells – Burnley – 2017–18

Canada 
Scott Arfield – Burnley – 2014–15, 2016–18 
Jim Brennan – Norwich City – 2004–05
Theo Corbeanu – Wolverhampton Wanderers – 2020–21
Terry Dunfield – Manchester City – 2000–01
David Edgar – Newcastle United, Burnley – 2006–10
Craig Forrest – Ipswich Town, Chelsea, West Ham United – 1992–95, 1996–2001
Junior Hoilett – Blackburn Rovers, Queens Park Rangers, Cardiff City – 2009–13, 2014–15, 2018–19
Simeon Jackson – Norwich City – 2011–13
Tomasz Radzinski – Everton, Fulham – 2001–07
Paul Stalteri – Tottenham Hotspur, Fulham – 2005–08
Frank Yallop – Ipswich Town – 1992–95

Costa Rica 
Joel Campbell – Arsenal – 2014–16
Cristian Gamboa – West Bromwich Albion – 2014–16
Keylor Navas – Nottingham Forest – 2022–
Bryan Oviedo – Everton, Sunderland – 2012–17
Bryan Ruiz – Fulham – 2011–14
Mauricio Solís – Derby County – 1996–98
Paulo Wanchope – Derby County, West Ham United, Manchester City – 1996–2001, 2003–04

Cuba 
Onel Hernández – Norwich City – 2019–20

Curaçao 
Kemy Agustien – Swansea City – 2011–13
Vurnon Anita – Newcastle United – 2012–16
Juninho Bacuna – Huddersfield Town – 2018–19
Leandro Bacuna – Aston Villa, Cardiff City – 2013–16, 2018–19
Kenji Gorré – Swansea City – 2014–15
Cuco Martina – Southampton, Everton – 2015–18
Shelton Martis – West Bromwich Albion – 2008–09

Grenada 
Shandon Baptiste – Brentford – 2021–
Delroy Facey – Bolton Wanderers – 2002–04
Jason Roberts – West Bromwich Albion, Portsmouth, Wigan Athletic, Blackburn Rovers, Reading – 2002–04, 2005–13

Guyana 
Matthew Briggs – Fulham – 2006–07, 2010–14
Carl Cort – Wimbledon, Newcastle United, Wolverhampton Wanderers – 1996–2004
Leon Cort – Stoke City, Burnley – 2008–10
Neil Danns – Blackburn Rovers, Birmingham City – 2002–04, 2007–08

Honduras 
Roger Espinoza – Wigan Athletic – 2012–13
Maynor Figueroa – Wigan Athletic, Hull City – 2007–15
Iván Guerrero – Coventry City – 2000–01
Milton Núñez – Sunderland – 1999–2000
Wilson Palacios – Birmingham City, Wigan Athletic, Tottenham Hotspur, Stoke City – 2007–15
Hendry Thomas – Wigan Athletic – 2009–11

Jamaica 

Rolando Aarons – Newcastle United – 2014–16, 2017–18
Michail Antonio – West Ham United – 2015–
Leon Bailey – Aston Villa – 2021–
Giles Barnes – Derby County, West Bromwich Albion – 2007–08, 2010–11
Jermaine Beckford – Everton – 2010–12
Trevor Benjamin – Leicester City – 2000–02, 2003–04
Elliott Bennett – Norwich City – 2011–14
Deon Burton – Derby County, Portsmouth – 1997–2002, 2003–04
Darren Byfield – Aston Villa – 1997–98
Jamal Campbell-Ryce – Charlton Athletic – 2002–04
Shaun Cummings – Reading – 2012–13
Claude Davis – Sheffield United, Derby County – 2006–08
Simon Dawkins – Aston Villa – 2012–13
Bobby Decordova-Reid – Cardiff City, Fulham – 2018–19, 2020–21, 2022–
Lloyd Doyley – Watford – 2006–07
Robbie Earle – Wimbledon – 1992–2000
Jason Euell – Wimbledon, Charlton Athletic, Middlesbrough, Blackpool – 1995–2000, 2001–07, 2010–11
Damien Francis – Wimbledon, Norwich City, Wigan Athletic, Watford – 1997–98, 1999–2000, 2004–07
Ricardo Fuller – Portsmouth, Stoke City – 2004–05, 2008–12
Ricardo Gardner – Bolton Wanderers – 2001–12
Marcus Gayle – Wimbledon – 1993–2000
Lewis Grabban – Norwich City, Bournemouth – 2015–17
Anthony Grant – Chelsea – 2004–05
Andre Gray – Burnley, Watford – 2016–20
Paul Hall – Coventry City – 1998–2000
Barry Hayles – Fulham – 2001–04
Michael Hector – Fulham – 2020–21
Omari Hutchinson – Chelsea – 2022–
Micah Hyde – Watford – 1999–2000
David Johnson – Ipswich Town – 2000–01
Jermaine Johnson – Bolton Wanderers – 2001–03
Michael Johnson – Birmingham City, Derby County – 2002–03, 2007–08
Marlon King – Watford, Wigan Athletic, Hull City, Middlesbrough – 2006–10
Jamie Lawrence – Leicester City, Bradford City – 1994–95, 1996–97, 1999–2001
Dexter Lembikisa – Wolverhampton Wanderers – 2022–
Kevin Lisbie – Charlton Athletic – 1998–99, 2000–07
Jamal Lowe – Bournemouth – 2022–23
Jamar Loza – Norwich City – 2013–14
Danny Maddix – Queens Park Rangers – 1992–93, 1994–96
Adrian Mariappa – Watford, Reading, Crystal Palace – 2006–07, 2012–20
Jobi McAnuff – Reading – 2012–13 
Garath McCleary – Reading – 2012–13
Darren Moore – West Bromwich Albion, Derby County – 2002–03, 2004–06, 2007–08
Liam Moore – Leicester City – 2014–15
Wes Morgan – Leicester City – 2014–21
Ravel Morrison – West Ham United, Sheffield United – 2013–15, 2019–20
Nyron Nosworthy – Sunderland – 2005–06, 2007–10
Kasey Palmer – Huddersfield Town – 2017–18
Ethan Pinnock – Brentford – 2021–
Darryl Powell – Derby County, Birmingham City – 1996–2003
Marvin Robinson – Derby County – 1998–2000, 2001–02
Theo Robinson – Watford – 2006–07
Luton Shelton – Sheffield United – 2006–07
Fitzroy Simpson – Manchester City – 1992–95
Frank Sinclair – Chelsea, Leicester City – 1992–2002, 2003–04
Kevin Stewart – Liverpool – 2015–17
Lee Williamson – Watford – 2006–07

Mexico 

Pablo Barrera – West Ham United – 2010–11
Jared Borgetti – Bolton Wanderers – 2005–06
Nery Castillo – Manchester City – 2007–08
Giovani dos Santos – Tottenham Hotspur – 2008–12
Guillermo Franco – West Ham United – 2009–10
Javier Hernández – Manchester United, West Ham United – 2010–16, 2017–20
Raúl Jiménez – Wolverhampton Wanderers – 2018–
Miguel Layún – Watford – 2015–16
Carlos Salcido – Fulham – 2010–11
Carlos Vela – Arsenal, West Bromwich Albion – 2008–11

Montserrat 
Brandon Comley – Queens Park Rangers – 2014–15
Bruce Dyer – Crystal Palace – 1994–95, 1997–98
Ruel Fox – Norwich City, Newcastle United, Tottenham Hotspur – 1992–2000

Saint Kitts and Nevis 
Bobby Bowry – Crystal Palace – 1992–93, 1994–95
Sagi Burton – Crystal Palace – 1997–98
Adam Newton – West Ham United – 1999–2000
Romaine Sawyers – West Bromwich Albion – 2020–21
Calum Willock – Fulham – 2001–03

Suriname 
Ryan Donk – West Bromwich Albion – 2008–09

Trinidad and Tobago 

Ian Cox – Crystal Palace – 1994–95
Carlos Edwards – Sunderland – 2007–09
Shaka Hislop – Newcastle United, West Ham United, Portsmouth – 1995–2002, 2003–06
Gavin Hoyte – Arsenal – 2008–09
Justin Hoyte – Arsenal, Sunderland, Middlesbrough, – 2002–09
Stern John – Birmingham City, Sunderland – 2002–05, 2007–08
Kenwyne Jones – Southampton, Sunderland, Stoke City, Cardiff City – 2004–05, 2007–14
Clint Marcelle – Barnsley – 1997–98
Jlloyd Samuel – Aston Villa, Bolton Wanderers – 1999–2010 
Jason Scotland – Wigan Athletic – 2009–10
Tony Warner – Fulham – 2005–06, 2007–08
Dwight Yorke – Aston Villa, Manchester United, Blackburn Rovers, Birmingham City, Sunderland – 1992–2005, 2007–09

United States 

Brenden Aaronson – Leeds United – 2022–
Tyler Adams – Leeds United – 2022–
Jozy Altidore – Hull City, Sunderland – 2009–10, 2013–15
DaMarcus Beasley – Manchester City – 2006–07
Carlos Bocanegra – Fulham – 2003–08
Michael Bradley – Aston Villa – 2010–11
Geoff Cameron – Stoke City – 2012–18
Bobby Convey – Reading – 2006–08
Jay DeMerit – Watford – 2006–07
Clint Dempsey – Fulham, Tottenham Hotspur – 2006–14
Landon Donovan – Everton – 2009–10, 2011–12
Maurice Edu – Stoke City – 2012–13
Benny Feilhaber – Derby County – 2007–08
Ian Feuer – West Ham United, Derby County – 1999–2000, 2001–02
Brad Friedel – Liverpool, Blackburn Rovers, Aston Villa, Tottenham Hotspur – 1997–2000, 2001–14
Lynden Gooch – Sunderland – 2016–17
Brad Guzan – Aston Villa, Middlesbrough – 2008–09, 2011–17
Marcus Hahnemann – Reading, Wolverhampton Wanderers – 2006–08, 2009–11
John Harkes – Sheffield Wednesday, West Ham United, Nottingham Forest – 1992–93, 1995–96, 1998–99
Stuart Holden – Bolton Wanderers – 2009–11
Tim Howard – Manchester United, Everton – 2003–16
Emerson Hyndman – Bournemouth – 2017–19
Eddie Johnson – Fulham – 2007–08, 2009–11
Jemal Johnson – Blackburn Rovers – 2004–06
Cobi Jones – Coventry City – 1994–95
Jermaine Jones – Blackburn Rovers – 2010–11
Kasey Keller – Leicester City, Tottenham Hotspur, Southampton, Fulham – 1996–99, 2001–05, 2007–08
Jovan Kirovski – Birmingham City – 2002–04
Eddie Lewis – Fulham, Derby County – 2001–02, 2007–08
Eric Lichaj – Aston Villa – 2010–13
Matt Miazga – Chelsea – 2015–16
Brian McBride – Everton, Fulham – 2002–08
Weston McKennie – Leeds United – 2022–
Joe-Max Moore – Everton – 1999–2002
Oguchi Onyewu – Newcastle United – 2006–07
Owen Otasowie – Wolverhampton Wanderers – 2020–21
Preki – Everton – 1992–94
Christian Pulisic – Chelsea – 2019–
Tim Ream – Bolton Wanderers, Fulham – 2011–12, 2018–19, 2020–21, 2022–
Claudio Reyna – Sunderland, Manchester City – 2001–07
Chris Richards – Crystal Palace – 2022–
Antonee Robinson – Fulham – 2020–21, 2022–
Josh Sargent – Norwich City – 2021–22
Brek Shea – Stoke City – 2012–14
Johann Smith – Bolton Wanderers – 2006–07
Juergen Sommer – Queens Park Rangers – 1995–96
Jonathan Spector – Manchester United, Charlton Athletic, West Ham United – 2004–11
Zack Steffen – Manchester City – 2020–22
Indiana Vassilev – Aston Villa – 2019–20
Roy Wegerle – Blackburn Rovers, Coventry City – 1992–95
Zak Whitbread – Norwich City – 2011–12
Danny Williams – Huddersfield Town – 2017–19
DeAndre Yedlin – Tottenham Hotspur, Sunderland, Newcastle United – 2014–16, 2017–21

Oceania (OFC)

New Zealand 
Simon Elliott – Fulham – 2005–06
Danny Hay – Leeds United – 2000–01
Ryan Nelsen – Blackburn Rovers, Tottenham Hotspur, Queens Park Rangers – 2004–13
Lee Norfolk – Ipswich Town – 1994–95
Winston Reid – West Ham United – 2010–11, 2012–18
Chris Wood – West Bromwich Albion, Leicester City, Burnley, Newcastle United, Nottingham Forest – 2008–09, 2010–11, 2014–15, 2017–

South America (CONMEBOL)

Argentina 

Sergio Agüero – Manchester City – 2011–21
Carlos Alcaraz – Southampton – 2022–
Julián Álvarez – Manchester City – 2022–
Ricky Álvarez – Sunderland – 2014–15
Marcos Angeleri – Sunderland – 2010–11
Julio Arca – Sunderland, Middlesbrough – 2000–03, 2005–09
Christian Bassedas – Newcastle United – 2000–02
Luciano Becchio – Norwich City – 2012–14
Federico Bessone – Swansea City – 2011–12
Sebastián Blanco – West Bromwich Albion – 2014–15
Mauro Boselli – Wigan Athletic – 2010–11, 2012–13
Emiliano Buendía – Norwich City, Aston Villa – 2019–20, 2021–
Facundo Buonanotte – Brighton & Hove Albion – 2022–
Fabián Caballero – Arsenal – 1998–99
Willy Caballero – Manchester City, Chelsea, Southampton – 2014–
Jonathan Calleri – West Ham United – 2016–17
Esteban Cambiasso – Leicester City – 2014–15
Horacio Carbonari – Derby County – 1998–2002
Guido Carrillo – Southampton – 2017–18
Juan Cobián – Sheffield Wednesday – 1998–99
Fabricio Coloccini – Newcastle United – 2008–09, 2010–16
Daniel Cordone – Newcastle United – 2000–01
Hernán Crespo – Chelsea – 2003–04, 2005–06
Andrés D'Alessandro – Portsmouth – 2005–06
Martín Demichelis – Manchester City – 2013–16
Ángel Di María – Manchester United – 2014–15
Franco Di Santo – Chelsea, Blackburn Rovers, Wigan Athletic – 2008–13
Alejandro Faurlín – Queens Park Rangers – 2011–13, 2014–15
Federico Fazio – Tottenham Hotspur – 2014–15
Enzo Fernández – Chelsea – 2022–
Federico Fernández – Swansea City, Newcastle United – 2014–22
Mauro Formica – Blackburn Rovers – 2011–12
Juan Foyth – Tottenham Hotspur – 2018–20
Esteban Fuertes – Derby County – 1999–2000
Ramiro Funes Mori – Everton – 2015–18
Alejandro Garnacho – Manchester United – 2021–
Paulo Gazzaniga – Southampton, Tottenham Hotspur – 2012–16, 2017–20
Jonás Gutiérrez – Newcastle United, Norwich City – 2008–09, 2010–15
Gabriel Heinze – Manchester United – 2004–07
Martín Herrera – Fulham – 2002–03
Gonzalo Higuaín – Chelsea – 2018–19
Emiliano Insúa – Liverpool – 2006–10
Erik Lamela – Tottenham Hotspur – 2013–21
Manuel Lanzini – West Ham United – 2015–
Giovani Lo Celso – Tottenham Hotspur – 2019–22
Alexis Mac Allister – Brighton & Hove Albion – 2019–
Carlos Marinelli – Middlesbrough – 1999–2004
Emiliano Martínez – Arsenal, Aston Villa – 2014–15, 2016–17, 2019–
Lisandro Martínez – Manchester United – 2022–
Javier Mascherano – West Ham United, Liverpool – 2006–11
Juan Carlos Menseguez – West Bromwich Albion – 2008–09
Nicolás Otamendi – Manchester City – 2015–20
Mauricio Pellegrino – Liverpool – 2004–05
Sixto Peralta – Ipswich Town – 2001–02
Roberto Pereyra – Watford – 2016–20
Máximo Perrone – Manchester City – 2022–
Ignacio Pussetto – Watford – 2019–20
Maxi Rodríguez – Liverpool – 2009–12
Marcos Rojo – Manchester United – 2014–20
Cristian Romero – Tottenham Hotspur – 2021–
Sergio Romero – Manchester United – 2015–18
Facundo Sava – Fulham – 2002–04
Lionel Scaloni – West Ham United – 2005–06
Ignacio Scocco – Sunderland – 2013–14
Marcos Senesi – Bournemouth – 2022–
Julián Speroni – Crystal Palace – 2004–05, 2013–16, 2017–19
Denis Stracqualursi – Everton – 2011–12
Mauricio Taricco – Tottenham Hotspur – 1998–2004
Carlos Tevez – West Ham United, Manchester United, Manchester City – 2006–13
Leonardo Ulloa – Leicester City, Brighton & Hove Albion – 2014–18
Santiago Vergini – Sunderland – 2013–15
Juan Sebastián Verón – Manchester United, Chelsea – 2001–04
Luciano Vietto – Fulham – 2018–19
Emanuel Villa – Derby County – 2007–08
Nelson Vivas – Arsenal – 1998–2001
Claudio Yacob – West Bromwich Albion – 2012–18
Pablo Zabaleta – Manchester City, West Ham United – 2008–20
Mauro Zárate – Birmingham City, West Ham United, Queens Park Rangers, Watford – 2007–08, 2014–17
Luciano Zavagno – Derby County – 2001–02

Bolivia 
Jaime Moreno – Middlesbrough – 1995–96
Marcelo Moreno – Wigan Athletic – 2009–10

Brazil 

Alex – Chelsea – 2007–12
Alisson Becker – Liverpool – 2018–
Allan – Everton – 2020–22
Afonso Alves – Middlesbrough – 2007–09
Anderson – Manchester United – 2007–15
Anderson Silva – Everton – 2006–07
Antony – Manchester United – 2022–
Fábio Aurélio – Liverpool – 2006–11
Júlio Baptista – Arsenal – 2006–07
Juliano Belletti – Chelsea – 2007–10
Bernard – Everton – 2018–21
Bernardo – Brighton & Hove Albion – 2018–21
Léo Bonatini – Wolverhampton Wanderers – 2018–19
Branco – Middlesbrough – 1995–97
Caçapa – Newcastle United – 2007–09
Carlos Vinícius – Tottenham Hotspur, Fulham – 2020–21, 2022–
Casemiro – Manchester United – 2022–
Philippe Coutinho – Liverpool, Aston Villa – 2012–18, 2021–
Danilo – Manchester City – 2017–19
Danilo – Nottingham Forest – 2022–
David Luiz – Chelsea, Arsenal – 2011–14, 2016–21
Denílson – Arsenal – 2006–11
Diego Carlos – Aston Villa – 2022–
Doni – Liverpool – 2011–12
Doriva – Middlesbrough – 2002–06
Douglas Luiz – Aston Villa – 2019–
Ederson – Manchester City – 2017–
Edu – Arsenal – 2000–05
Elano – Manchester City – 2007–09
Emerson – Middlesbrough – 1996–97
Emerson Royal – Tottenham Hotspur – 2021–
Evandro – Hull City – 2016–17
Fabinho – Liverpool – 2018–
Fábio – Manchester United, Queens Park Rangers, Cardiff City, Middlesbrough – 2009–14, 2016–17
Felipe – Nottingham Forest – 2022–
Felipe Anderson – West Ham United – 2018–21
Fernandinho – Manchester City – 2013–22
Fernando – Manchester City – 2014–17
Filipe Luís – Chelsea – 2014–15
Roberto Firmino – Liverpool – 2015–
Fred – Manchester United – 2018–
Fumaça – Newcastle United – 1999–2000
Gabriel Jesus – Manchester City, Arsenal – 2016–
Gabriel Magalhães – Arsenal – 2020–
Gabriel Martinelli – Arsenal – 2019–
Gabriel Paulista – Arsenal – 2014–17
Geovanni – Manchester City, Hull City – 2007–10
Gilberto – Tottenham Hotspur – 2007–09
Gilberto Silva – Arsenal – 2002–08
Gláuber – Manchester City – 2008–09
Heurelho Gomes – Tottenham Hotspur, Watford – 2008–11, 2015–18
Bruno Guimarães – Newcastle United – 2021–
Guly do Prado – Southampton – 2012–14
Gustavo Scarpa – Nottingham Forest – 2022–
Ilan – West Ham United – 2009–10
Isaías – Coventry City – 1995–97
Mário Jardel – Bolton Wanderers – 2003–04
Jô – Manchester City, Everton – 2008–11
João Gomes – Wolverhampton Wanderers – 2022–
João Pedro – Watford – 2019–20, 2021–22
Joelinton – Newcastle United – 2019–
Júlio César – Bolton Wanderers – 2004–05
Júlio César – Queens Park Rangers – 2012–13
Juninho – Middlesbrough – 1995–97, 1999–2000, 2002–04
Kayky – Manchester City – 2021–22
Kenedy – Chelsea, Watford, Newcastle United – 2015–19, 2021–22
Kléberson – Manchester United – 2003–05
Renan Lodi – Nottingham Forest – 2022–
Lucas Leiva – Liverpool – 2007–17
Lucas Moura – Tottenham Hotspur – 2017–
Lucas Paquetá – West Ham United – 2022–
Lyanco – Southampton – 2021–
Maicon – Manchester City – 2012–13
Fernando Marçal – Wolverhampton Wanderers – 2020–22
Marquinhos – Arsenal – 2022–23
Matheus Cunha – Wolverhampton Wanderers – 2022–
Mineiro – Chelsea – 2008–09
Nenê – West Ham United – 2014–15
Neto – Bournemouth – 2022–
Oscar – Chelsea – 2012–17
Alexandre Pato – Chelsea – 2015–16
Paulinho – Tottenham Hotspur – 2013–15
Andreas Pereira – Manchester United, Fulham – 2014–16, 2018–20, 2022–
Matheus Pereira – West Bromwich Albion – 2020–21
Bruno Perone – Queens Park Rangers – 2011–12
Lucas Piazon – Chelsea – 2012–13
Rafael – Manchester United – 2008–15
Ramires – Chelsea – 2010–16
Raphinha – Leeds United – 2020–22
Richarlison – Watford, Everton, Tottenham Hotspur – 2017–
Douglas Rinaldi – Watford – 2006–07
Robinho – Manchester City – 2008–10
Fábio Rochemback – Middlesbrough – 2005–08
Rodrigo – Everton – 2002–03
Roque Júnior – Leeds United – 2003–04
Samir – Watford – 2021–22
Sandro – Tottenham Hotspur, Queens Park Rangers, West Bromwich Albion – 2010–16
André Santos – Arsenal – 2011–12
Rafael Schmitz – Birmingham City – 2007–08
Thiago Silva – Chelsea – 2020–
Sylvinho – Arsenal, Manchester City – 1999–2001, 2009–10
Alex Telles – Manchester United – 2020–22
Tetê – Leicester City – 2022–
Emerson Thome – Sheffield Wednesday, Chelsea, Sunderland, Bolton Wanderers – 1997–2004
Wesley – Aston Villa – 2019–22
Willian – Chelsea, Arsenal, Fulham – 2013–21, 2022–
Willian José – Wolverhampton Wanderers – 2020–21

Chile 
Clarence Acuña – Newcastle United – 2000–03
Jean Beausejour – Birmingham City, Wigan Athletic – 2010–13
Claudio Bravo – Manchester City – 2016–18, 2019–20
Mark González – Liverpool – 2006–07
Ángelo Henríquez – Wigan Athletic – 2012–13
Mauricio Isla – Queens Park Rangers – 2014–15
Gonzalo Jara – West Bromwich Albion – 2010–12
Luis Jiménez – West Ham United – 2009–10
Javier Margas – West Ham United – 1998–2001
Gary Medel – Cardiff City – 2013–14
David Pizarro – Manchester City – 2011–12
Alexis Sánchez – Arsenal, Manchester United – 2014–19
Francisco Sierralta – Watford – 2021–22
Eduardo Vargas – Queens Park Rangers – 2014–15
Carlos Villanueva – Blackburn Rovers – 2008–09

Colombia 
Steven Alzate – Brighton & Hove Albion – 2019–22
Juan Pablo Ángel – Aston Villa – 2000–07
Pablo Armero – West Ham United – 2013–14
Faustino Asprilla – Newcastle United – 1995–98
Juan Cuadrado – Chelsea – 2014–16
Luis Díaz – Liverpool – 2021–
Jhon Durán – Aston Villa – 2022–
Bernardo Espinosa – Middlesbrough – 2016–17
Radamel Falcao – Manchester United, Chelsea – 2014–16
Cucho Hernández – Watford – 2021–22
Víctor Ibarbo – Watford – 2015–16
José Izquierdo – Brighton & Hove Albion – 2017–19, 2020–21
Jefferson Lerma – Bournemouth – 2018–20, 2022–
Yerry Mina – Everton – 2018–
David Ospina – Arsenal – 2014–18
Hámilton Ricard – Middlesbrough – 1998–2002
Hugo Rodallega – Wigan Athletic, Fulham – 2008–14
James Rodríguez – Everton – 2020–21
Carlos Sánchez – Aston Villa, West Ham United – 2014–16, 2018–20
Davinson Sánchez – Tottenham Hotspur – 2017–
Luis Sinisterra – Leeds United – 2022–
Jhon Viáfara – Portsmouth – 2005–06
Juan Camilo Zúñiga – Watford – 2016–17

Ecuador 

Christian Benítez – Birmingham City – 2009–10
Felipe Caicedo – Manchester City – 2007–09
Moisés Caicedo – Brighton & Hove Albion – 2021–
Segundo Castillo – Everton, Wolverhampton Wanderers – 2008–10
Ulises de la Cruz – Aston Villa, Reading – 2002–08
Agustín Delgado – Southampton – 2001–04
Pervis Estupiñán – Brighton & Hove Albion – 2022–
Fernando Guerrero – Burnley – 2009–10
Iván Kaviedes – Crystal Palace – 2004–05
Jefferson Montero – Swansea City – 2014–17
Juan Carlos Paredes – Watford – 2015–16
Jeremy Sarmiento – Brighton & Hove Albion – 2021–
Antonio Valencia – Wigan Athletic, Manchester United – 2006–19
Enner Valencia – West Ham United, Everton – 2014–17

Paraguay 
Antolín Alcaraz – Wigan Athletic, Everton – 2010–15
Miguel Almirón – Newcastle United – 2018–
Fabián Balbuena – West Ham United – 2018–21
Paulo da Silva – Sunderland – 2009–11
Julio Enciso – Brighton & Hove Albion – 2022–
Diego Gavilán – Newcastle United – 1999–2001
Juan Iturbe – Bournemouth – 2015–16
Cristian Riveros – Sunderland – 2010–11
Roque Santa Cruz – Blackburn Rovers, Manchester City – 2007–11

Peru 
André Carrillo – Watford – 2017–18
Diego Penny – Burnley – 2008–10
Claudio Pizarro – Chelsea – 2007–09
Nolberto Solano – Newcastle United, Aston Villa, West Ham United – 1998–2008
Ysrael Zúñiga – Coventry City – 1999–2001

Uruguay 

Rodrigo Bentancur – Tottenham Hotspur – 2021–
Miguel Britos – Watford – 2015–19
Martín Cáceres – Southampton – 2016–17
Edinson Cavani – Manchester United – 2020–22
Sebastián Coates – Liverpool, Sunderland – 2011–13, 2014–16
Diego Forlán – Manchester United – 2001–05
Ignacio María González – Newcastle United – 2008–09
Abel Hernández – Hull City – 2014–15, 2016–17
Walter Alberto López – West Ham United – 2008–09
Diego Lugano – West Bromwich Albion – 2013–14
Williams Martínez – West Bromwich Albion – 2005–06
Darwin Núñez – Liverpool – 2022–
Walter Pandiani – Birmingham City – 2004–06
Adrián Paz – Ipswich Town – 1994–95
Facundo Pellistri – Manchester United – 2022–
Omar Pouso – Charlton Athletic – 2006–07
Diego Poyet – West Ham United – 2014–15
Gus Poyet – Chelsea, Tottenham Hotspur – 1997–2004
Gastón Ramírez – Southampton, Hull City, Middlesbrough – 2012–17
Darío Silva – Portsmouth – 2005–06
Gonzalo Sorondo – Crystal Palace, Charlton Athletic – 2004–07
Cristhian Stuani – Middlesbrough – 2016–17
Luis Suárez – Liverpool – 2010–14
Lucas Torreira – Arsenal – 2018–20
Guillermo Varela – Manchester United – 2015–16
Matías Viña – Bournemouth – 2022–

Venezuela 
Fernando Amorebieta – Fulham – 2013–14
Salomón Rondón – West Bromwich Albion, Newcastle United, Everton – 2015–19, 2021–23

Notes

References

Since 1888... The Searchable Premiership and Football League Player Database (subscription required) 

 
England
Foreign
Association football player non-biographical articles